= Tishdal =

- King of Goyim
- Born: Zagros Mountains
- dynasty: Hurrian dynasty
- Religion: Hurrian religion

Tishdal was a Hurrian ruler from the Zagros mountains. According to David Rohl, he is identifiable with Tidal, king of Goyim from the Book of Genesis, 14:1. The word goyim in Biblical Hebrew can be translated as "nations" or "peoples" (in modern Hebrew it means "Gentiles") although some Bible commentaries suggest that in this verse it may instead be a reference to the region of Gutium. Tidal was one of the four kings who fought Abraham in the Battle of the Vale of Siddim.

== See also ==
- Amraphel
- Chedorlaomer
- Arioch
- Melchizedek
- Tish-atal
