= Tidal (king) =

- King of Goiim
- House: Goiim

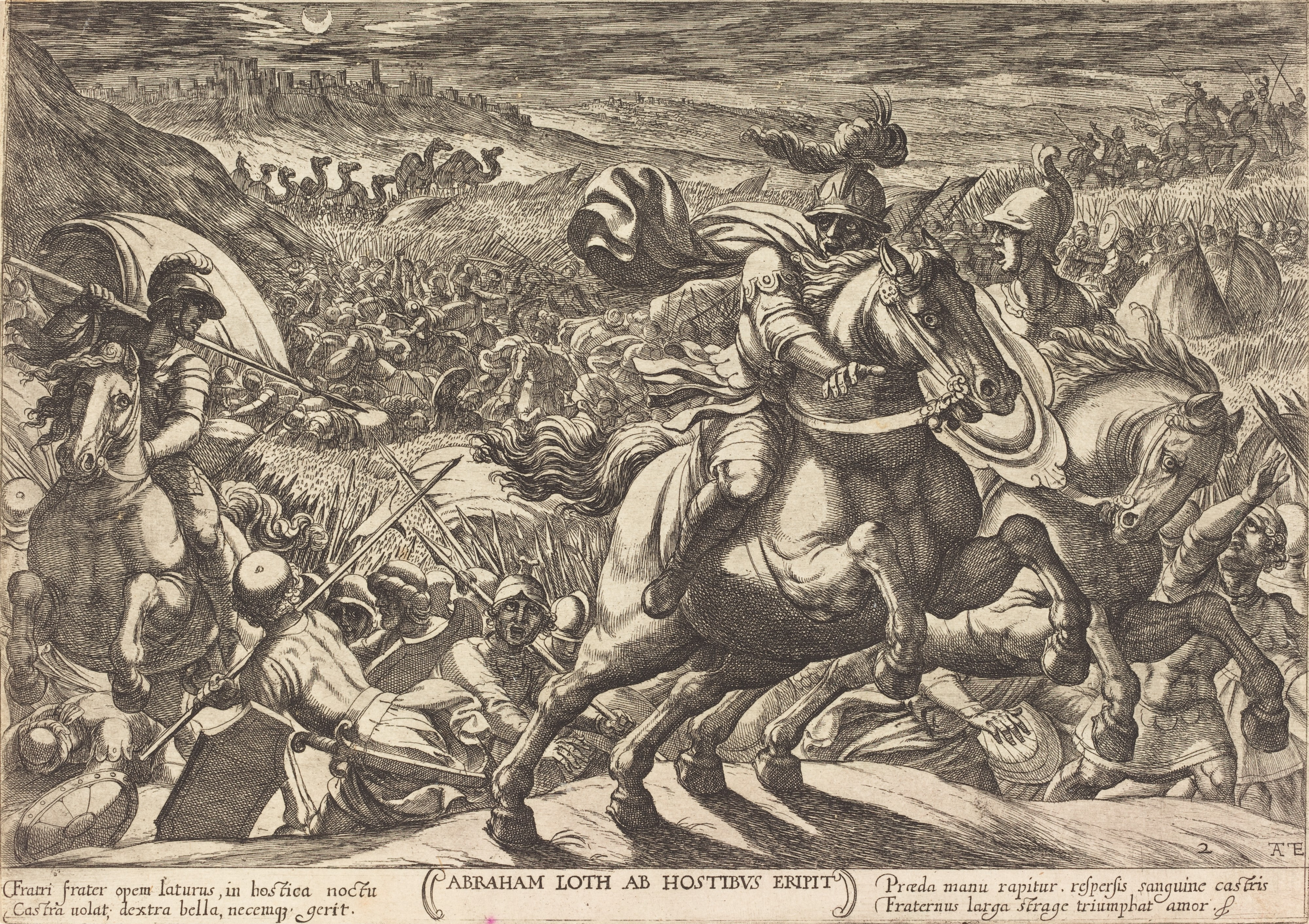

In the Old Testament, Tidal (Hebrew: תִּדְעָל, Modern: Tīdʿal, Tiberian: Tīḏʿāl) is a king of Goyim. Septuagint: "Θαργὰλ βασιλεὺς ἐθνῶν." In the Book of Genesis (14:1), he is described as one of the four kings who fought against a group of rebel kings in the Battle of Siddim.

== Biblical narrative ==
Led by Chedorlaomer, the four kings Amraphel, Arioch, Chedorlaomer, and Tidal engaged in a punitive expedition against five kings of Canaan who rebelled against Chedorlaomer, namely Bera of Sodom, Birsha of Gomorrah, Shinab of Admah, Shemeber of Zeboim, and Zoar of Bela. Abram's nephew Lot is captured during the battle, leading Abram (later Abraham) to engage in a rescue expedition.

== Modern scholarship ==
Historical scholarship was "not yet successful" in identifying who Tidal was, but modern scholars have attempted to identify the original context of the story and potential historical correspondents. It has been speculated that the name Tidal is a Hebrew rendering of Tudhaliya, the name of several Hittite and Neo-Hittite kings. The name continued as "Tudal" down to the Neo-Hittite period. Stephanie Dalley argues that Tidal should be identified as the military leader ‘Tudhaliya the chief cupbearer’ mentioned on a clay tablet from the pre-Hittite Assyrian colony at Kanesh. Alternatively, Gard Granerød regards Tidal as literary figure rather than a historical one. According to him, the name Tidal could be originated from a foreign story that Jewish people learned from the foreign diaspora community, which included Elamites and many other foreigners, as mentioned in Ezra 4.

The kingdom of Goyim has not been identified, but modern scholars have speculated that it may refer to Hittites, Hurrians and other groups in central Anatolia. The Genesis Apocryphon (col. 21) places it in Mesopotamia. In Biblical Hebrew, the word is generally translated as "nations" or "peoples". In the Latin Vulgate, the text is rendered as Thadal rex gentium (Thadal, king of nations).

== See also ==
- Amraphel
- Arioch
- Chedorlaomer
- Goy
- Melchizedek
- Tudiya
