= Melchizedek =

Biblical figure

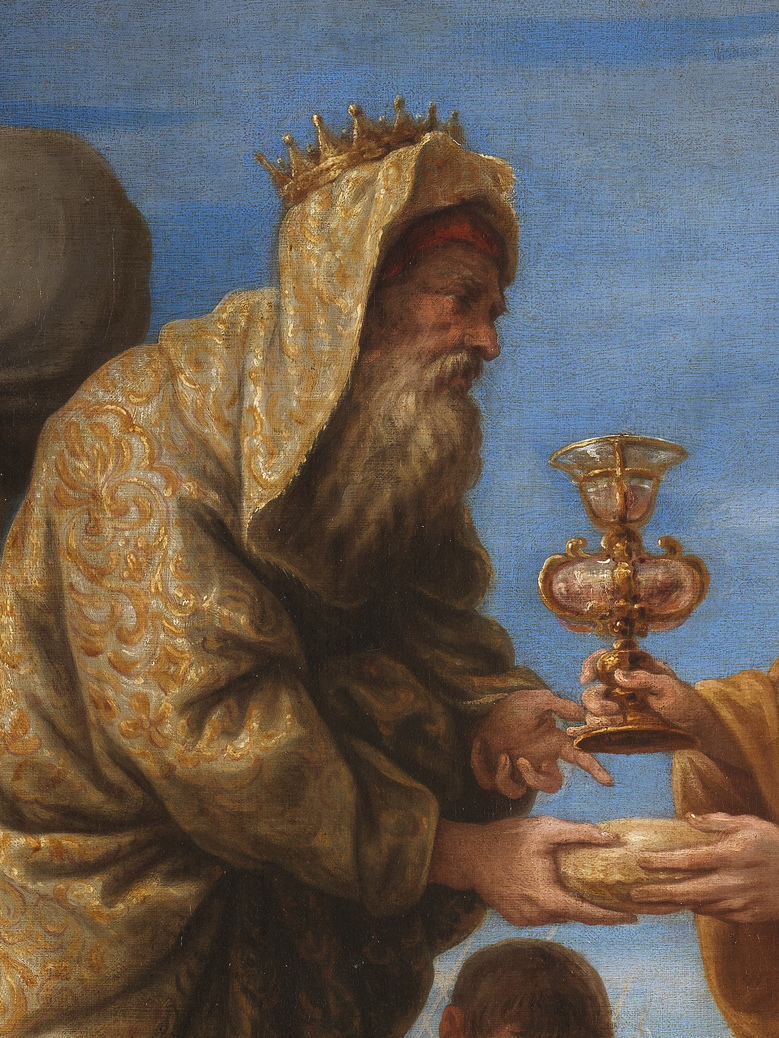
- Detail from Abraham and Melchizedek by Juan Antonio de Frías y Escalante, 1668

Priest and King of Salem
- Venerated in: Anglican Communion; Catholic Church; The Church of Jesus Christ of Latter-day Saints; Eastern Orthodox Church; Oriental Orthodox Churches; Ismailism; Judaism; Protestantism; Theosophy
- Canonized: Pre-Congregation
- Feast: 22 May (Eastern Orthodox Church); 26 August (Catholic Church)

In the Hebrew Bible, Melchizedek (Note: /mɛlˈkɪzədɛk/; Biblical Hebrew: מַלְכִּי־צֶדֶק, romanized: malkī-ṣeḏeq, 'king of righteousness', 'my king is righteousness', or 'my king is Zedek'; also transliterated Melchisedech, Melchisedec, Malkisedek or Malki Tzedek) was the king of Salem and priest of El Elyon (often translated as "God Most High"). He is mentioned in Genesis 14:18–20, where he brings out bread and wine and blesses Abram (Abraham), following the Battle of the Vale of Siddim and Abram's subsequent rescue of the captives and plunder taken in the battle, and in Psalm 110:4.

In Christianity, according to the Epistle to the Hebrews, Jesus Christ is identified as "High priest forever in the order of Melchizedek", and so Jesus assumes the role of High Priest once and for all. Chazalic literature – specifically Targum Jonathan, Targum Yerushalmi, and the Babylonian Talmud – presents his name (מלכי־צדק) as a nickname for Shem.

Joseph Blenkinsopp has suggested that the story of Melchizedek is an informal insertion into the Genesis narration, possibly inserted in order to give validity to the priesthood and titles connected with the Second Temple. It has also been conjectured that the suffix "-zedek" may have been or become a reference to a Canaanite deity worshipped in Jebusite Jerusalem.

== Name ==
In the majority of Masoretic Hebrew texts the name is written as two words, Malki-ṣedeq מלכי־צדק, rendered in one word in both the Septuagint (Μελχισεδέκ) and Vulgate (Melchisedech). The Authorised King James Version of 1611 renders the name "Melchizedek" when translating from the Hebrew, and "Melchisedec" in the New Testament.

The name is composed from the two elements: melek(h), 'king', and ṣedeq, which means either 'righteousness' or the proper name Zedek. With the addition of the hiriq compaginis (-ī) indicating the archaic construct form, malk-ī means 'king of', so that the name literally translates to 'king of righteousness' or 'my king is Zedek', indicating that he worshipped Zedek, a Canaanite deity worshipped in pre-Israelite Jerusalem. The latter, however, is often dismissed since Hebrews 7:2 gives the translation of the name Melchizedek as "king of righteousness", although Robert R. Cargill has recently argued in favour of that etymology. Mainstream scholarly understanding of these names ("My King is Righteousness" and "My Lord is Righteousness" respectively) is that they refer to the concept of righteousness and not to a god.

The name is formed in parallel with Adoni-ṣedeq אדני־צדק, a king of Jerusalem mentioned in Joshua 10:1–3, where the element malik ('king') is replaced by adon ('lord'). (Note: Ramban, Bereishith chapter 14, opines that the name implies "my king is tzedek", based on the notion that the city of Salem is associated with the attribute of righteousness.) Parallel theophoric names, with Sedeq replaced by Yahu, are those of Malchijah and Adonijah, both biblical characters placed in the time of David.

== Hebrew Tanakh ==
=== Genesis 14 ===
The narrative of Genesis 14 is part of the larger story telling how Abram returns from defeating king Chedorlaomer and meets with Bera the king of Sodom, at which point:

And Melchizedek king of Salem brought out bread and wine: and he was [is] the priest of the most high God. And he blessed him, and said, 'Blessed be Abram to the most high God, possessor of heaven and earth, And blessed be the most high God, which hath delivered thine enemies into thy hand'. And he gave him tithe from all.

— Genesis 14:18–20, King James Version

Some textual critics classify the narration as not being derived from any of the usual pentateuchal sources. It has been speculated that verses 18–20 (in which Melchizedek appears) are an informal insertion into the narration, as they interrupt the account of the meeting of Abraham with the king of Sodom. There is no consensus on when or why the story might have been added. It may have been inserted in order to give validity to the priesthood and tithes connected with the Second Temple. It also may have been inserted to give validity to the superiority of the Zadokite priests over the Levite priests.

Lebanese Protestant scholar Kamal Salibi (1929–2011) observes that Hebrew: ֹמַעֲשֵׂר, romanized: m'sr, which literally does mean 'tenth', might more loosely be used to mean 'portion', and Hebrew: מִכֹּל, romanized: m-kl, or 'from all', might refer just to food in the giver's possession, so that the whole verse might mean "He gave him a portion of food".

Genesis 14:18 introduces Melchizedek, a "Priest of the Most High God" (El Elyon), a term which is re-used in Genesis 14:19–20 and Genesis 14:22. The term "Most High" is used another twenty times to refer to the God of Israel in the Psalms. Giorgio Levi Della Vida (1944) suspects that this is a late development, and Joseph Fitzmyer (1962) connects Genesis 14 with the mention of a god called "Most High," who may appear according to one of three possible translations of a 750 BC inscription found at Al-Safirah in Syria. Remi Lack (1962) considers that the Genesis verses were taken over by Jewish redactor(s), for whom El was already identified with YHWH, El-Elyon became an epithet for the God of Israel.

==== Tithe recipient ====
Due to an ambiguity in the Hebrew text, it is unclear who gave tithe to whom: Abram to Melchizedek, or Melchizedek to Abram: the verse in question states simply, "And [he] gave him tithe from all" (v-yiten-lo ma'aser mekol, ויתן לו מעשר מכל). Most translations of this verse preserve the ambiguity, "he gave to him", but some modern translations make explicit the mainstream interpretation of Abram being the giver and Melchizedek the recipient.Hebrews 7:9-10 explicitly states that Levi paid tithes through Abraham to Melchizedek.

Targum Pseudo-Jonathan, the Book of Jubilees, Josephus, Philo of Alexandria, and Rashi all read Abram as the giver of the tithe to Melchizedek. The Rogatchover Gaon, also understanding Abram to be the tithe giver, comments that the presented tithe was not a standard tithe (Maaser Rishon) as described in the Torah (given on an annual basis), but was a one-time "tribute offering" (trumat ha-mekhes, תרומת המכס), such as Moses gave to God in Numbers 31:41.

Expressing a kabbalistic point of view, the Zohar commentary to Genesis 14 cites Rabbi Yitzchak as saying that it was God who gave a tithe to Abram in the form of removing the Hebrew letter He from his own throne of glory and presenting it to the soul of Abram for his benefit.

Rabbi Meir Simcha of Dvinsk (1843–1926) interprets the phrase "And he gave him tithe from all" as a verbal continuation of Melchizedek's speech, i.e., Melchizedek exclaimed that God had chosen to gift Abram a tenth of God's possession of the entire human race (consisting of seventy nations as described in Genesis) in the form of the seven nations of the land of Canaan, including the cities of Sodom that Abram succeeded in saving. Rabbi Meir Simcha argues that continued speech of this sort was a common form of prophetic expression. (Note: I.e., beginning in a form of talking to the person directly and ending the speech as speaking for the recipient – Meshech Chochma to Bereishit chapter 14.)

=== Psalm 110 ===
The only other Hebrew Bible mention of Melchizedek is in Psalm 110:4. The many translations that follow the Septuagint, such as the Vulgate, KJV 1611, and JPS 1917, translate it as:

The LORD hath sworn, and will not repent: 'Thou art a priest for ever after the manner of Melchizedek.'

— (JPS 1917)

Although the above is the traditional translation of the text, the Hebrew text can be interpreted in various ways, and the New Jewish Publication Society of America Tanakh, (1985 edition), for example, has:

You are a priest forever, a rightful king by My decree.

— JPS 1985)

Another alternative keeps Melchizedek as a personal name but changes the identity of the person addressed: "You are a priest forever by my order (or 'on my account'), O Melchizedek" – here it is Melchizedek who is being addressed throughout the psalm.

The majority of Chazalic literature attributes the primary character of the psalm as King David (Note: Based on the text שב לימיני with "Yemini" referring either to King Saul of the tribe of Benjamin (Binyamin) whom David was careful not to overthrow or to the Torah (as per it being referred to as "from his right hand – a fire of religion to them" Deuteronomy)) who was a "righteous king" (מלכי צדק) of Jerusalem and, like Melchizedek, had certain priest-like responsibilities, while the Babylonian Talmud understands the chapter as referring to Abram who was victorious in battling to save his nephew Lot and merited priesthood. The Zohar defines the noted Melchizedek as referring to Aaron the Kohen Gadol (high priest).

== Samaritan Pentateuch ==
In Genesis 14, the Samaritan Pentateuch reads שלמו (lit. 'his peace' or in contextual flow 'allied with him') in place of the Masoretic שלם (Salem), with addition of a letter ו (vav).

William F. Albright views the Samaritan wording as authentic, (Note: Albright reads melek shelomo (מלך-שלמו) "of his peace", instead of melek Salem, "king of Jerusalem", brought out bread and wine...") as does the New American Bible.

Regarding the residence of Melchizedek, Samaritan tradition identified a "Salem" as a place on the slopes of Mount Gerizim which served as a blessing place of the children of Israel upon their initial crossing of the Jordan river. The Samaritans allocate Gerizim (and not Jerusalem) as the site intended for the Temple, and thus the "שלמו" text serves an obvious sectarian purpose. However, this practice is not solely associated with the Samaritans: the possessive suffix is also found in the 3rd- or 2nd-century BC Book of Jubilees, and Greek possessive suffixes are even used in the Septuagint version of Genesis.

== New Testament ==
With respect to Genesis 14:20, Hebrews chapter 7 verses 2 and 4 in the New Testament state that the patriarch Abraham gave a tenth of the spoil to Melchizedek.

Psalm 110:4 is cited in the New Testament letter to the Hebrews as an indicator that Jesus, regarded in the letter as the Messiah, had a right to a priesthood pre-dating the Jewish Aaronic priesthood (Hebrews 5:5–6).

== In Judaism ==
=== Hasmonean dynasty ===
The Babylonian Talmud recounts that Hasmonean rulers used to identify themselves as "High Priest of El Elyon": "When the Hasmonean kingdom became strong and defeated the Greeks, they instituted that people should mention the name of Heaven even in their legal documents. And therefore they would write: In year such and such of Yoḥanan the High Priest of the God Most High." Scholars have observed that the Hasmoneans used Melchizedek's example of monarch-priest to justify occupying both offices.

=== Late Hellenistic Judaism ===
Josephus refers to Melchizedek as a "Canaanite chief" in The Jewish War, but as a priest in Antiquities of the Jews.

Philo identifies Melchizedek with the Logos as priest of God, and honoured as an untutored priesthood.

The Second Book of Enoch (also called "Slavonic Enoch") is apparently a Jewish sectarian work of the 1st century AD. The last section of the work, the Exaltation of Melchizedek, tells how Melchizedek was born of a virgin, Sofonim (or Sopanima), the wife of Nir, a brother of Noah. The child came out from his mother after she had died and sat on the bed beside her corpse, already physically developed, clothed, speaking and blessing the Lord, and marked with the badge of priesthood. Forty days later, Melchizedek was taken by the archangel Gabriel (Michael in some manuscripts) to the Garden of Eden and was thus preserved from the Deluge without having to be in Noah's Ark.

The Story of Melchizedek is a short pseudepigraphon composed in Greek in the first three centuries AD, probably in a Jewish milieu. It survives today only in Christian recensions, but in at least ten languages.

=== Dead Sea Scrolls ===
11Q13 (11QMelch) is a fragment of a text, dated to the end of the second or start of the first century BC, about Melchizedek, found in Cave 11 at Qumran in the West Bank and part of the Dead Sea Scrolls. Melchizedek is seen as a divine being in the text and is referred to as "El" or "Elohim", titles usually reserved for God. According to the text, Melchizedek will proclaim the "Day of Atonement" and he will atone for the people who are predestined to him. He also will judge the peoples.

The Genesis Apocryphon (1QapGen) repeats information from Genesis.

The Qumran Scrolls, also indicate that Melchizedek was used as a name of the Archangel Michael, interpreted as a heavenly priest; Michael as Melchi-zedek contrast with Belial, who is given the name of Melchi-resha 'king of wickedness'. The text of the Epistle to the Hebrews follows this interpretation in stating explicitly that the name in Greek translation (ἑρμηνευόμενος) means βασιλεὺς δικαιοσύνης ('king of righteousness'), omitting translation of the possessive suffix; the same passage interprets Melchizedek's title of king of Salem as translating to βασιλεὺς εἰρήνης 'king of peace', the context being the presentation of Melchizedek's as an eternal priesthood associated with Jesus Christ (ἀφωμοιωμένος δὲ τῷ υἱῷ τοῦ θεοῦ μένει ἱερεὺς εἰς τὸ διηνεκές, 'made like unto the Son of God abideth a priest continually').

=== Torah commentaries ===
Hebrew-language Torah commentarians of the Rishonim era (11th to 15th centuries) have explained the (seemingly) abrupt intrusion of Melchizedek into the narration in various ways; Hezekiah ben Manoah (c. 1250) points out that the following verses have Abraham refusing any of the king of Sodom's possessions which, if not for the insertion of Melchizedek's hospitality, would prompt the query as to where Abraham and his weary men got their refreshments from. The Rashbam, Shmuel ben Meir (11th century), offers a similar explanation but varies by saying that only Abram's men partook in the booty (originally belonging to the king of Sodom) whereas the Melchizedek intrusion explains that Abram himself was sustained by Melchizedek since he refused to consume of the luxury of Sodom because his Lord was of the non-material world. Likewise, the commentary of Chaim ibn Attar (17th century) offers a three-pronged slew of reasons for the Melchizedek insertion.

=== In rabbinic literature ===
The narrative preceding Melchizedek's introduction presents a picture of Melchizedek's involvement in the events of his era. The narration details Abram's rescue of his nephew Lot and his spectacular defeat of multiple kings and goes on to define the meeting place of Melchizedek and Abram as "Emek HaShaveh which is Emek HaMelech". The meeting site has been associated with Emek Yehoshaphat (the Valley of Josaphat). Targum Onkelos describes the meeting location's size as "a plot the size of a king's Riis". Midrashic exegesis describes how a large group of governors and kings convened in unison to pay homage to the victor Abram and desired to make him a deity, at which point he declined, attributing his victory to God's might and will alone.

The chronological work Seder ha-Dorot (published 1769) quotes that Melchizedek was the first to initiate and complete a wall in circumference of the city, and had to exit Salem to reach Abram and his men. Upon exiting Salem, he presented to them "bread and wine" with the intent to refresh them from their journey. Assuming the premise that Melchizedek was Shem, he would have been 465 years old at the time and Abram was 75 years of age.

Chazalic literature unanimously identify Melchizedek as Shem son of Noah (Targum Yonathan to Genesis chapter 14, Genesis Rabbah 46:7, Babylonian Talmud to Tractate Nedarim 32b). The Talmud Bavli attributes him (Shem and his beth din court of justice) as pioneers in banning prostitution (Avodah Zarah p. 36a).

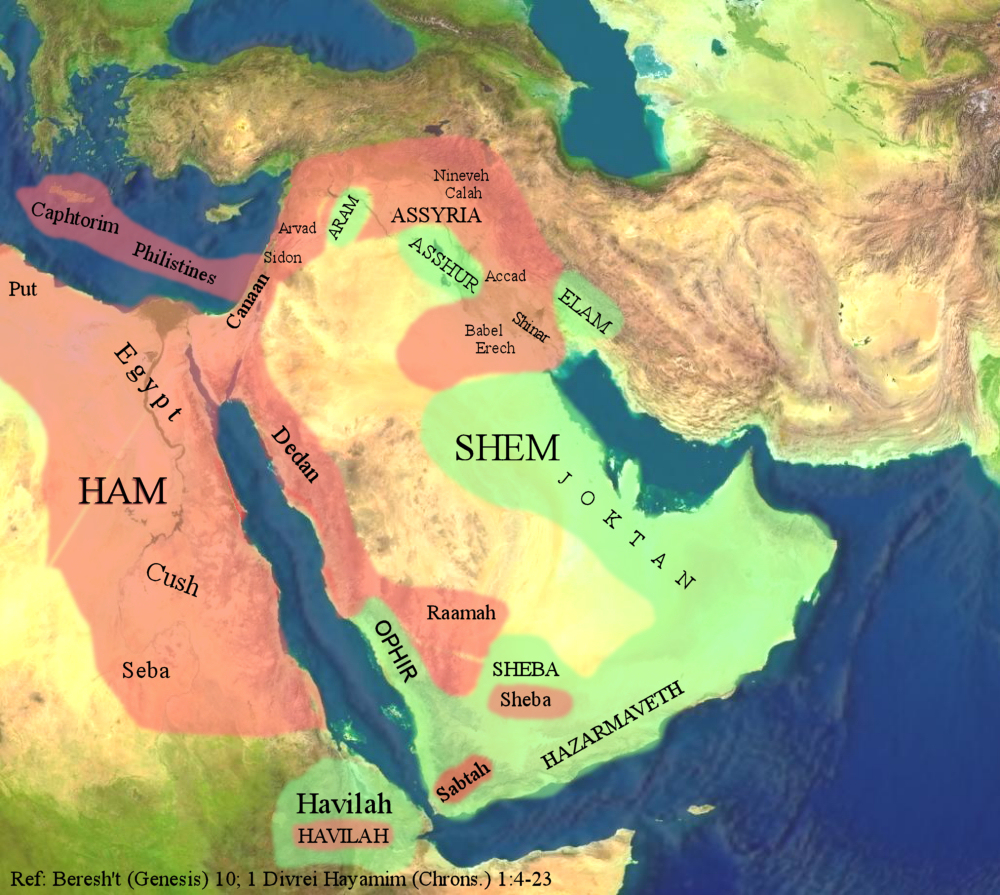
Middle Eastern land distribution demonstrating the land of Canaan governed by Cham

There is, however, disagreement amongst Rishonim as to whether Salem was Melchizedek/Shem's allocated residence by his father Noah or whether he was a foreigner in Salem which was considered the rightful land of his brother Cham. The Ramban is of the opinion that the land was rightfully owned and governed by the offspring of Cham, and explains that Melchizedek/Shem left his home country and came to Salem as a foreigner wishing to serve God as a Kohen. However, Rashi maintains that the land of Canaan was initially allotted to Shem, by Noah his father, and the offspring of Cham conquered the land by forced expansion.

==== Transition of the Priesthood ====
Although Melchizedek is the first person in the Torah to be titled a Kohen (priest), the medrash records that he was preceded in priesthood (kehuna) by Adam. Rabbinic commentarians to the Torah explain that Melchizedek – (sometimes associated with Shem) – was given the priesthood (Hebrew: kehuna) by receipt of his father Noah's blessing "G-d beatified Yefeth and will dwell in the house of Shem"; i.e., he will merit to serve and host God as a Kohen.

Torah Laws require that the Kohen (priest) must be a patrilineal descendant of a prior Kohen. Leviticus Rabbah maintains that God intended to permanently bring forth the priesthood (Kehuna) through Melchizedek's patrilineal descendants, but since Melchizedek preceded Abram's blessing to that of God, God instead chose to bring the priesthood (kehuna) forth from Abram's descendants. As the text states in regard to Melchizedek; "and he is a Kohen" (והוא כהן) meaning himself in the exclusive sense and not his patrilineal descendants.

The Ohr HaChayim commentary presents that God was not angered by Melchizedek's preceding Abram's blessing to that of God, since Abram was rightfully deemed worthy of precedence for independently coming to recognize God amidst a world of Paganism, but Melchizedek willingly gave the priesthood to Abram upon recognizing his outstanding uniqueness and godly character traits.

Rabbinic authorities differ as to whether kehuna was given to Abram there and then or after the demise of Melchizedek.

The Midrash records that Shem functioned as kohen gadol (high priest) in that he taught Torah to the Patriarchs before it was publicly given at Mount Sinai, while the official title of High Priest was conferred upon Aaron after the erection of the Tabernacle.

==== Midrash text ====
The Midrash quotes multiple aspects of both Melchizedek and Abram; the Rabbis taught that Melchizedek acted as a priest and handed down Adam's robes to Abram (Numbers Rabbah 4:8).

Rabbi Isaac the Babylonian said that Melchizedek was born circumcised (Genesis Rabbah 43:6). Melchizedek called Jerusalem "Salem." (Genesis Rabbah 56:10.) The Rabbis said that Melchizedek instructed Abram in the Torah. (Genesis Rabbah 43:6.) Rabbi Eleazar said that Melchizedek's school was one of three places where the Holy Spirit (Ruach HaKodesh) manifested himself (Babylonian Talmud Makkot 23b).

Rabbi Judah said in Rabbi Nehorai's name that Melchizedek's blessing yielded prosperity for Abram, Isaac, and Jacob (Genesis Rabbah 43:8). Ephraim Miksha'ah the disciple of Rabbi Meir said in the latter's name that Tamar descended from Melchizedek (Genesis Rabbah 85:10).

Rabbi Hana bar Bizna citing Rabbi Simeon Hasida identified Melchizedek as one of the four craftsmen of whom Zechariah wrote in Zechariah 2:3. (Babylonian Talmud Sukkah 52b; see also Song of Songs Rabbah 2:33 (crediting Rabbi Berekiah in the name of Rabbi Isaac).) The Talmud teaches that David wrote the Book of Psalms, including in it the work of the elders, including Melchizedek.

Thus according to Jewish legend, confusion over Melchizedek being both King and Priest is solved by knowing that Shem was also a progenitor of the Davidic Monarchy, which descended from both Judah and Tamar, who was sentenced to 'death by fire' when accused of committing prostitution as the daughter of high priest Shem.

=== In the Zohar ===
The Zohar (redacted by Moses de León c. 1290s) finds in "Melchizedek king of Salem" a reference to "the King Who rules with complete sovereignty". or according to another explanation, that "Melchizedek" alludes to the lower world and "king of Salem" to the upper world (Zohar 1:86b–87a). The Zohar's commentary on Genesis 14 cites a Rabbi Yitzchak as saying that it was God who gave tithe to Abram in the form of removing the Hebrew letter He from his throne of glory and presenting it to the soul of Abram for his benefit. The letter he is the letter God added to Abram's name to become "Abra-ha-m" in Genesis.

== In Christianity ==
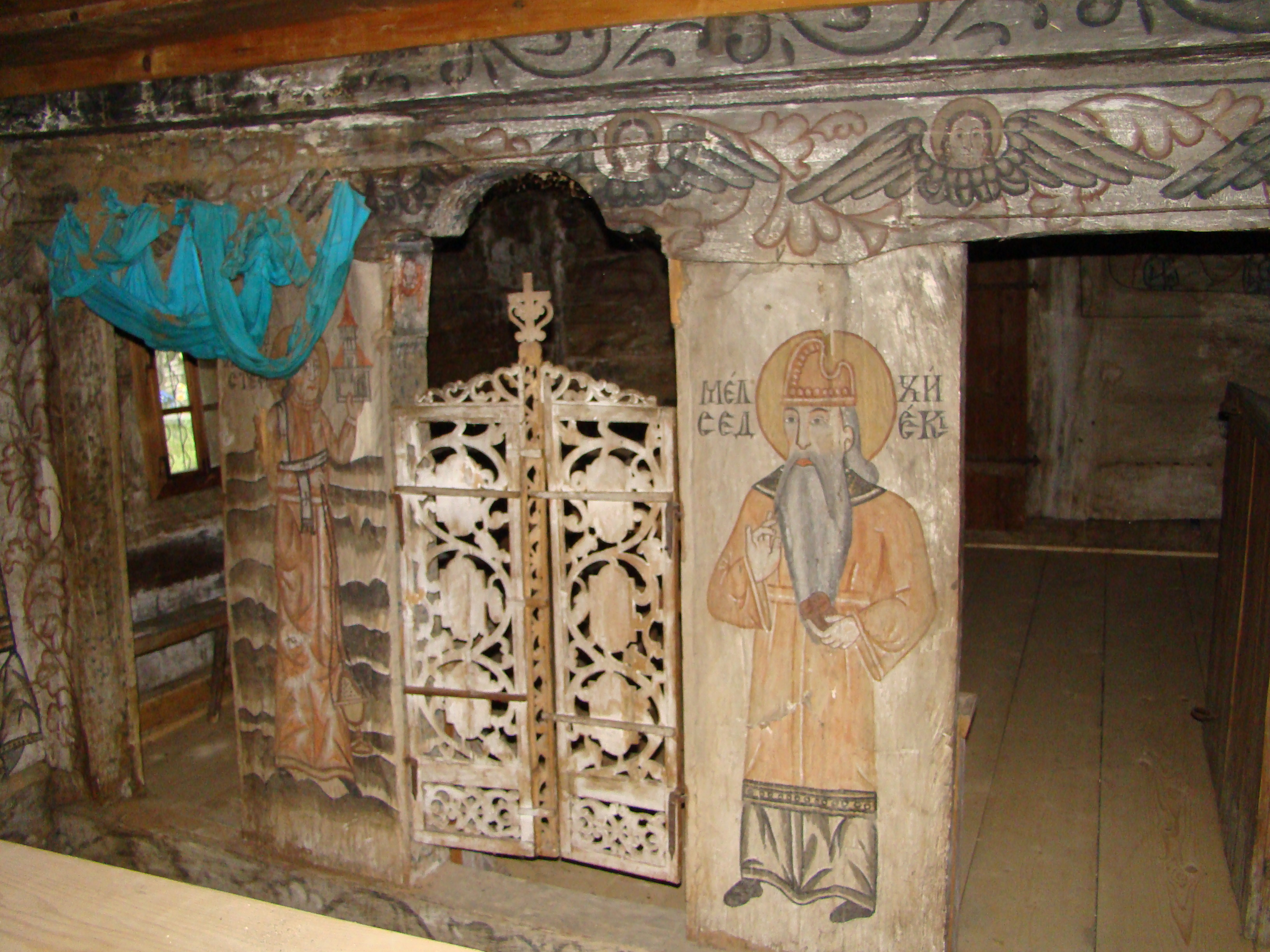
An image of Melchizedek painted onto the altar side near the Royal Doors at Libotin wooden church, Maramureș County, Romania

In the New Testament, references to Melchizedek appear only in the Epistle to the Hebrews, though these are extensive (Hebrews 5:6, 10; 6:20; 7:1, 10, 11, 15, 17, 21). Jesus Christ is there identified as "a priest forever in the order of Melchizedek", quoting from Psalm 110:4.

=== Association with the Messiah ===
The association or identification of Melchizedek with the Messiah predates Christianity, developing in Jewish messianism of the Second Temple period.

A collection of early Gnostic scripts dating on or before the 4th century, discovered in 1945 and known as the Nag Hammadi library, contains a tractate pertaining to Melchizedek. Here it is proposed that Melchizedek is Jesus Christ. Melchizedek, as Jesus Christ, lives, preaches, dies and is resurrected, in a gnostic perspective. The Coming of the Son of God Melchizedek speaks of his return to bring peace, supported by God, and he is a priest-king who dispenses justice.

The association with Christ is made explicit by the author of the Epistle to the Hebrews, where Melchizedek the "king of righteousness" and "king of peace" is explicitly associated with the "eternal priesthood" of the Son of God.

This association between Melchizedek and Jesus is indirectly supported by a quotation attributed directly to Jesus himself in the Gospel of John, in which Jesus obliquely claims to have personally met Abraham: "Abraham your father rejoiced to see my day; he saw it and was glad." (John 8:56.)

The Christological interpretation of this Old Testament character being a prefiguration or prototype of the Christ has varied between Christian denominations. Typological association of Jesus Christ with Old Testament characters occurs frequently in the New Testament and in later Christian writings; thus, Jesus Christ is also associated with Adam (as the "New Adam") and with Abraham. The bread and wine offering of Melchizedek has been interpreted by church fathers including Clement of Alexandria as being a prefiguration of the Eucharist.

The Pelagians saw in Melchizedek merely a man who lived a perfect life.

=== Liturgical commemoration ===
Melchizedek is mentioned in the Roman Canon, the First Eucharistic Prayer of the Roman rite of the Catholic Church, and also figures in the current Roman Martyrology as a commemoration on August 26.

He is commemorated in the Eastern Orthodox Church on May 22, and on the "Sunday of the Forefathers" (two Sundays before Christmas). In the Calendar of Saints of the Armenian Apostolic Church Melkisetek (Armenian: Մելքիսեդեք, romanized: Melkisetek) is commemorated as one of the Holy Forefathers on July 26.

=== Protestantism ===
Traditional Protestant Christian denominations, following Luther, teach that Melchizedek was a historical figure and an archetype of Christ.

Tremper Longman III notes that a popular understanding of the relationship between Melchizedek and Jesus is that Melchizedek is an Old Testament Christophany – in other words, that Melchizedek is Jesus, or at the very least, is a close resemblance of Jesus.

=== Latter Day Saint movement ===
In the Latter Day Saint movement, the Book of Mormon makes reference to Melchizedek in (Alma 13:17–19). According to Encyclopædia Britannica, Joseph Smith, the movement's founder, "appointed his male followers to priesthoods, named for the biblical figures Melchizedek and Aaron, that were overseen by the office of High Priest", incorporating selected practices from the Hebrew Bible. These priesthoods are laid out by Smith in Doctrine and Covenants 107:1–2, 4, 6–10, 14, 17–18, 22, 29, 71, 73, 76, as well as more than twenty additional references in that work.

The largest denomination in the movement, the Church of Jesus Christ of Latter-day Saints, states it derives authority to act in God's name through the Melchizedek Priesthood, both from an administrative perspective and a ministering capacity. According to the church's summary of the Melchizedek Priesthood, there are two priesthoods, "the Melchizedek and the Aaronic," and the Melchizedek is the higher or greater priesthood, "after the order of the Son of God (or Jesus Christ)." According to their doctrine, this is the priesthood of Jesus Christ himself, but this power is not directly cited as His power to avoid the frequent repetition of His sacred name. Its offices include elder, high priest, patriarch, seventy, and apostle.

=== God Worshipping Society ===
Hong Xiuquan, the founder of the God Worshipping Society, rejected the notion of Trinity and claimed to be the incarnation of Melchizedek, a younger brother of Jesus and the second-son of God.

== In Islam ==
Although Melchizedek is not referred to in the Quran, some have identified him with the figure known as the Khidr. In Isma'ilism, Melchizedek (known as Malik as-Salām; lit. 'King of Peace') is believed to have been the one to initiate Abraham into prophethood.

According to the Kalam-i-Pir, the Divinity (Mawlānā) manifested itself in perfect human form in each generation. In the first three generations of mankind, Mawlānā appeared under three different names, each of which are variations on Melchizedek's name or title, such as melekh Salem, King of Salem, in Genesis 14:18. The Sabaeans, who were the people of Adam, the first prophet, identified Melchizedek with Seth and believed that he would appear as a judge at the resurrection to reveal teachings kept secret. Melchizedek appeared again at the time of the flood during the generation of Noah, and at Sodom's punishment during the generation of Abraham.

== In modern culture ==
Earl "Chinna" Smith (born 6 August 1955), also known by the honorific title, “Melchizedek the High Priest”, is a Jamaican guitarist active since the late 1960s. He is most well known for his work with the Soul Syndicate band and as guitarist for Bob Marley & the Wailers, among others, and has recorded with many reggae artists, appearing on more than 500 albums.

Melchizedek appears as a character in Paulo Coelho's novel The Alchemist, where he guides the protagonist, Santiago.

Melchisedec is the name of a rat befriended by Sarah Crewe in The Little Princess by Frances Hodgson Burnett.

Melchizedek has a brief appearance in Samuel Butler's The Way of All Flesh.

Melchizedek is called "a priest unborn" in the song "Captain Woodstock's Courtship", recorded by Ian & Sylvia (an apparent reference to Hebrews 7:3).

== See also ==
- Amraphel
- Arioch
- Dominion of Melchizedek
- Lech-Lecha
- Melchisedechians
- Righteous Priest
- Zadok
