= Zuzim =

Zuzim may refer to:

- Zuzim, the plural form of Zuz (Jewish coin), a Jewish currency used in Roman Judea
- Zuzim (biblical people), a people mentioned in the Bible
