= Chedorlaomer =

King of Elam in the Bible

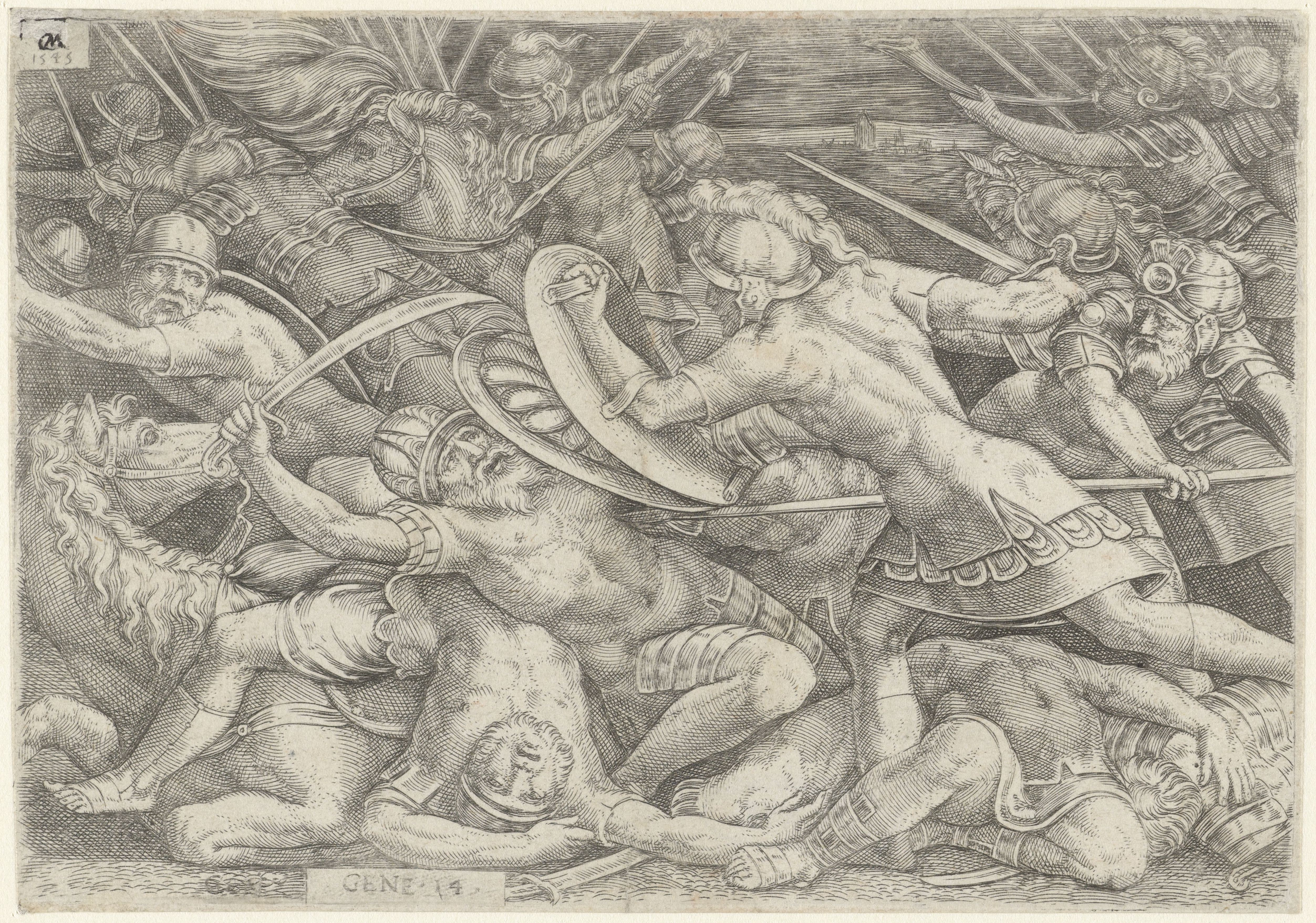
Battle of Abraham against Chedorlaomer by Cornelis Massijs, 1545

Chedorlaomer, also spelled Kedorlaomer, (Note: /ˌkɛdərˈleɪəmər/; Biblical Hebrew: כְּדָרְלָעֹמֶר, romanized: Kəḏorlāʿomer; Koine Greek: Χοδολλογομόρ, romanized: Khodollogomór) is a king of Elam mentioned in Genesis 14 in the Hebrew Bible, which contains an account of the Battle of Siddim. Genesis portrays him as allied with three other kings, campaigning against five Canaanite city-states in response to an uprising during the lifetime of Abraham.

== Etymology ==
The name Chedorlaomer is associated with familiar Elamite components, such as kudur, "servant", and Lagamal, an important goddess in the Elamite pantheon. The Jewish Encyclopedia states that, apart from the fact that Chedorlaomer can be identified as a proper Elamite compound, all else is matter of controversy and "the records give only the rather negative result that from Babylonian and Elamite documents nothing definite has been learned of Chedorlaomer".

== Background ==
=== Chedorlaomer's reign ===
After twelve years under Elamite rule, in the thirteenth year, the Cities of the Plain (Sodom, Gomorrah, Admah, Zeboim, and Zoara) rebelled against Chedorlaomer. To put down the rebellion, he called upon three other allies from Shinar, Ellasar, and King Tidal's "nations" regions (Genesis 14:9).

=== Chedorlaomer's campaigns ===
The following allies fought as allies of Chedorlaomer in the fourteenth year of his rule.

- King Amraphel of Shinar (possibly Sumer)
- King Arioch of Ellasar
- King Tidal of "nations" – possibly the Hittites.

Chedorlaomer's campaigns aimed to show Elam's might to all territories under Elamite authority. His armies and allies plundered tribes and cities for their provisions, who were en route to the revolting cities of the Jordan plain.

According to Genesis 14:8–10, these are the cities plundered by Elam:

- The Rephaites in Ashteroth Karnaim
- The Zuzim in Ham
- The Emites in Shaveh Kiriathaim
- The Horites in Mount Seir as far as the Desert of Paran near the wilderness
- The Amalekites in Kadesh at En-mishpat
- The Amorites in Hazezontamar (Ein Gedi)
- The Canaanites of the cities of the Jordan plain

=== Chedorlaomer's defeat ===
After warring against the cities of the plain at the Battle of Siddim, Chedorlaomer went to Sodom and Gomorrah to collect bounty. At Sodom, among the spoils of war, he took Lot and his entire household captive. When Lot's uncle Abraham received news of what happened, he assembled a battle unit of 318 men who pursued the Elamite forces north of Damascus to Hobah. Abraham and one of his divisions then proceeded to defeat Chedorlaomer. (Genesis 14:11–17)

While the King James Version verse 17 translated the Hebrew word in question as וַיַּכֵּם as slaughtered (Genesis 14:17), Robert Young's Literal Translation (1862) uses the term smiting.

== Historical identification ==
Genesis 14:1 identifies four kings: "It was in the time of Amraphel king of Shinar, Arioch king of Ellasar, Chedor-Laomer king of Elam, and Tidal king of the Goiim."

Following the discovery of documents written in the Elamite language and Babylonian language, it was thought that Chedorlaomer is a transliteration of the Elamite name Kudur-Lagamar. However, no mention of a king named Kudur-Lagamar has yet been found; inscriptions that were thought to contain this name are now known to have different names (the confusion arose due to similar lettering). According to Stephanie Dalley, the lack of extrabiblical attestations of the king's name is explained by the fact that there were several concurrent Elamite rulers in the 18th century BC, and that they are commonly referred to by their titles rather than by their names.

One modern interpretation of Genesis 14 is summed up by Michael Astour in The Anchor Bible Dictionary, in the articles on "Amraphel", "Arioch" and "Chedorlaomer", who explains the story as a product of anti-Babylonian propaganda during the 6th century Babylonian captivity of the Jews:

After Böhl's widely accepted, but wrong, identification of ^{m}Tu-ud-hul-a with one of the Hittite kings named Tudhaliyas, Tadmor found the correct solution by equating him with the Assyrian king Sennacherib (see Tidal). Astour (1966) identified the remaining two kings of the Chedorlaomer texts with Tukulti-Ninurta I of Assyria (see Arioch) and with the Chaldean Merodach-baladan (see Amraphel). The common denominator between these four rulers is that each of them, independently, occupied Babylon, oppressed it to a greater or lesser degree, and took away its sacred divine images, including the statue of its chief god Marduk; furthermore, all of them came to a tragic end ... All attempts to reconstruct the link between the Chedorlaomer texts and Genesis 14 remain speculative. However, the available evidence seems consistent with the following hypothesis: A Jew in Babylon, versed in Akkadian language and cuneiform script, found in an early version of the Chedorlaomer texts certain things consistent with his anti-Babylonian feelings.

The "Chedorlaomer tablets" are now thought to be from the 7th or 6th century BCE, a millennium after the time of Hammurabi, but at roughly the time when the main elements of Genesis are thought to have been set down. Another prominent scholar considers a relationship between the tablet and Genesis speculative, but identifies Tudhula as a veiled reference to Sennacherib of Assyria, and Chedorlaomer as "a recollection of a 12th century BCE king of Elam who briefly ruled Babylon."

Some modern scholars suggest that Chedorlomer in the Chedorlaomer tablets might refer to the Elamite usurper Kutir-Naḫḫunte in the 7th century BCE. He assassinated Khallushu, who murdered Shutruk-Naḫḫunte II and in 694 BCE managed to briefly capture Babylon and the Neo-Assyrian governor of Babylonia, Aššur-nādin-šumi, causing the Assyrian conquest of Elam.

The translation of "Chedorlaomer Tablets" from the Spartoli collection:

With their firm counsel, they established Kudur-KUKUmal, king of Elam. Now, one who is pleasing to them [-] will exercise kingship in Babylon, the city of Babylonia (...) What king of Elam is there who provided for Esagila and ... ? The Babylonians ... and [-] their message: “(As for) [the wo]rds that you wrote: ‘I am a king, son of king, of [royal seed e]ternal, [indeed] the son of a king's daughter who sat upon the royal throne. [As for] Dur-ṣil-ilani son of Erie[A]ku, who [carried off] plunder of [-], he sat on the royal throne ... [-] [As for] us, let a king come whose [lineage is] firmly founded] from ancient days, he should be called lord of Babylon (...) When the guardian of well-being cries [-] The protective spirit of Esharra [-] was frightened away. The Elamite hastened to evil deeds, for the Lord devised evil for Babylon. When the protective genius of justice stood aside, the protective spirit of Esharra, temple of all the gods, was frightened away. The Elamite enemy took away his possessions, Enlil, who dwelt therein, became furious. When the heavens (?) changed their appearance, the fiery glare and ill wind obliterated their faces. Their gods were frightened off, they went down to the depths. Whirlwinds, ill wind engulfed the heavens. Anu (the gods') creator had become furious. He diminished their (celestial) appearances, he laid waste (?) his (own celestial) position, with the burning of the shrine E-ana he obliterated its designs. [-] Esharra, the netherworld trembled. [Enlil?] commanded total destruction. [The god had] become furious: he commanded for Sumer the smashing of En[lil]'s land. Which one is Kudur-KUKUmal, the evil doer? He called therefore the Umman-man(da he level)led the land of Enlil, he laid waste (?) [-] at their side. When the [-] of Ê-zida, and Nabu, trustee of all [-] hastened to [-] He set [out] downstream, toward the ocean, Ibbi-Tutu, who was on the sea, hastened to the East, He (Nabu) crossed the sea and accupied a dwelling not his own. The rites of E-zida, the sure house, were deathly still. The Elamite [enemy] sent forth his chariotry, he headed dowstream toward Borsippa. He came down the dark way, he entered Borsippa. The vile Elamite toppled its sanctuary, he slew the nobles of ...with weapons, he plundered all the temples. He took their possessions and carried them off to Elam. He destroyed its wall, he filled the land [with weeping ...] (...) an improvident sovereign [-] he felled with weapons Dur-ṣil-ilani son of Eri-[e]Aku, he plundered [-] water over Babylon and Esagila, he slaughtered its [-] with his own weapon like sheep, [-] he burned with fire, old and young, [-] with weapons, [-] he cut down young and old. Tudḫula son of Gazza[-], plundered the [-] water over Babylon and Esagila, [-] his son smote his pate with his own weapon. [-] his lordship to the [rites] of Annunit[um] [king of] Elam [-] plundered the great ..., [-] he sent like the deluge, all the cult centers of Akkad and their sanctuaries he burned [with fi]re Kudur-KU[KU]mal his son c[ut?] his middle and his heart with an iron dagger, [-] his enemy he took and sought out (?). The wicked kings, criminals, [-] captured. The king of the gods, Marduk, became angry at them (...) [The doer] of evil to him [-] his heart [-] the doer of sin must not [-]
