= P.Yale 1 inv. 419 =

The P.Yale 1 inv. 419 (meaning "Papyrus Yale, 1 inventory number 419; also P. CtYBR 419, Rahlfs 814, VH 12, TM 61924) is a Septuagint manuscript of the biblical Book of Genesis. This is possibly the oldest fragment of Genesis written on papyrus in koine Greek. It is paleographically dated to the early 2nd century CE.

== History ==
This manuscript came from Cairo, and in 1964, it was published by C. Bradford Weller. The manuscript was in the form of a codex measuring 14 cm × 9.7 cm (5.5 in × 3.8 in).

== Content ==
The text contains part of the book of Genesis according to the Septuagint. On the recto it contains Gen 14:5–8 and on the verso Gen 14:12–15, part of the story of Abram rescuing Lot. This may be the oldest Jewish/Christian manuscript that attests to the codex form.

== Sources ==
- Welles, C. Bradford (1965). "The Yale Genesis fragment". The Yale University Library Gazette. 39 (1). Yale University Library: 1–8.
- Merk, Otto; Wolter, Michael, eds. (2019). "Papyrus Yalensis 1 als ältest bekannter christlicher Genesistext Zur Frühgeschichte des Kreuz-Symbols*". Im Zeichen des Kreuzes: Aufsätze von Erich Dinkler. Beihefte zur Zeitschrift für die neutestamentliche Wissenschaft. Vol. 61. Walter de Gruyter GmbH & Co KG. ISBN 9783110870220.
- Outler, Albert Cook; et al. (Trinity University (San Antonio, Tex.), Southwest Commission on Religious Studies) (1978). Walker, William O. (ed.). The Relationships Among the Gospels: An Interdisciplinary Dialogue. Trinity University monograph series in religion. Vol. 5. Trinity University Press. ISBN 9780911536737.
- Aland, Kurt; Rosenbaum, Hans-Udo, eds. (2018). Biblische Papyri, Altes Testament, Neues Testament, Varia, Apokryphen: RGCP I. Patristische Texte und Studien. Vol. 18. Walter de Gruyter GmbH & Co KG. ISBN 9783110832235.
- Hurtado, Larry W. (2006). The Earliest Christian Artifacts: Manuscripts and Christian Origins. Wm. B. Eerdmans Publishing. ISBN 9780802828958.
