= Emite =

People described in Genesis and Deuteronomy

The Moabite name for the Repha'im was the Emites (/ˈɛmaɪts/ or /ˈiːmaɪts/) or Emim (Hebrew: אֵמִים ʾĒmīm). They are mentioned in Genesis 14:5 as having been defeated at Shaveh-kiriathaim by an invading coalition of kings led by the Elamite King Chedorlaomer, and in the Book of Deuteronomy, chapter 2, as having been a powerful and populous people, "as tall as the Anakim". They were defeated by the Moabites, who occupied their land.

According to Rashi, their name is translated as "the dreaded ones", and the singular Ema/Emma (Hebrew: אימה) means "horror" or "terror". Albert Barnes states that the name was given to this people by the Moabites.
