= Amraphel =

Ancient Sumerian King

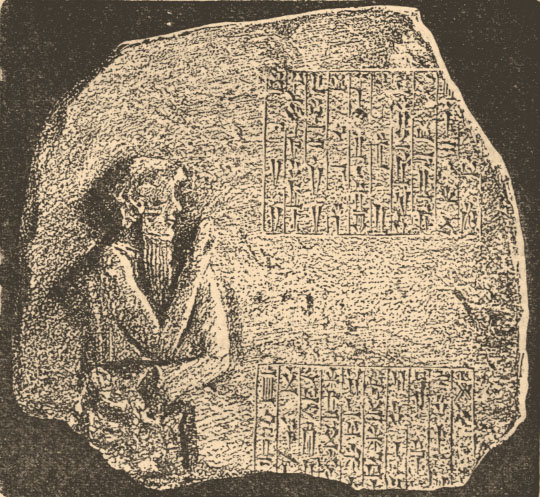
Illustration from the Jewish Encyclopedia showing Ḫammurabi on one of his steles as Amraphel

In the Hebrew Bible, Amraphel /ˈæmrəˌfɛl/ (Hebrew: אַמְרָפֶל, romanized: ’Amrāp̄el; Greek: Ἀμαρφάλ, romanized: Amarphál; Latin: Amraphel) was a king of Shinar (Hebrew for Sumer) who, in chapter 14 of the Book of Genesis, invaded Canaan, along with two other kings (Note: Arioch king of Ellasar and Tidal king of Goiim) under the leadership of Chedorlaomer, king of Elam. Chedorlaomer's coalition defeated Sodom and the other cities in the Battle of the Vale of Siddim.

== Modern identifications ==
Beginning with Eberhard Schrader in 1888, Amraphel was usually associated with Ḫammurabi, who ruled Babylonia from 1792 BC until his death in 1750 BC. This view has been largely abandoned in recent decades.

David Rohl has argued for an identification with Amar-Sin, the third ruler of the Ur III dynasty. Some suggest that Amraphel is a Semitic name that is composed of two elements, "Amar", which was also used by Sumerian King, Amar-Sin, and "a-p-l". John Van Seters, in Abraham in History and Tradition, rejected the historical existence of Amraphel. According to Stephanie Dalley, Amraphel was "[e]ither Hammurabi with an unexplained suffix -el, or Amud-piʾel, king of Qatna, with the common misreading of the letter r for d; possibly a confusion of the two names."

== In Rabbinic tradition ==
Rabbinic sources such as Midrash Tanhuma Lekh Lekhah 6, Targum Yonatan to Exodus 14:1, and Eruvin 53a identify Amraphel with Nimrod. This is also asserted in the 11th chapter of the Sefer haYashar, attested from the early 17th century:

And Nimrod dwelt in Babel, and he there renewed his reign over the rest of his subjects, and he reigned securely, and the subjects and princes of Nimrod called his name Amraphel, saying that at the tower his princes and men fell through his means.

— Sefer haYashar 11

Genesis Rabbah 42 says that Amraphel was called by three names: Cush, after his father's name (Gen. 10:8), Nimrod, because he established rebellion (mrd) in the world, and Amraphel, as he declared (amar) "I will cast down" (apilah).
