= Battle of Siddim =

Biblical battle

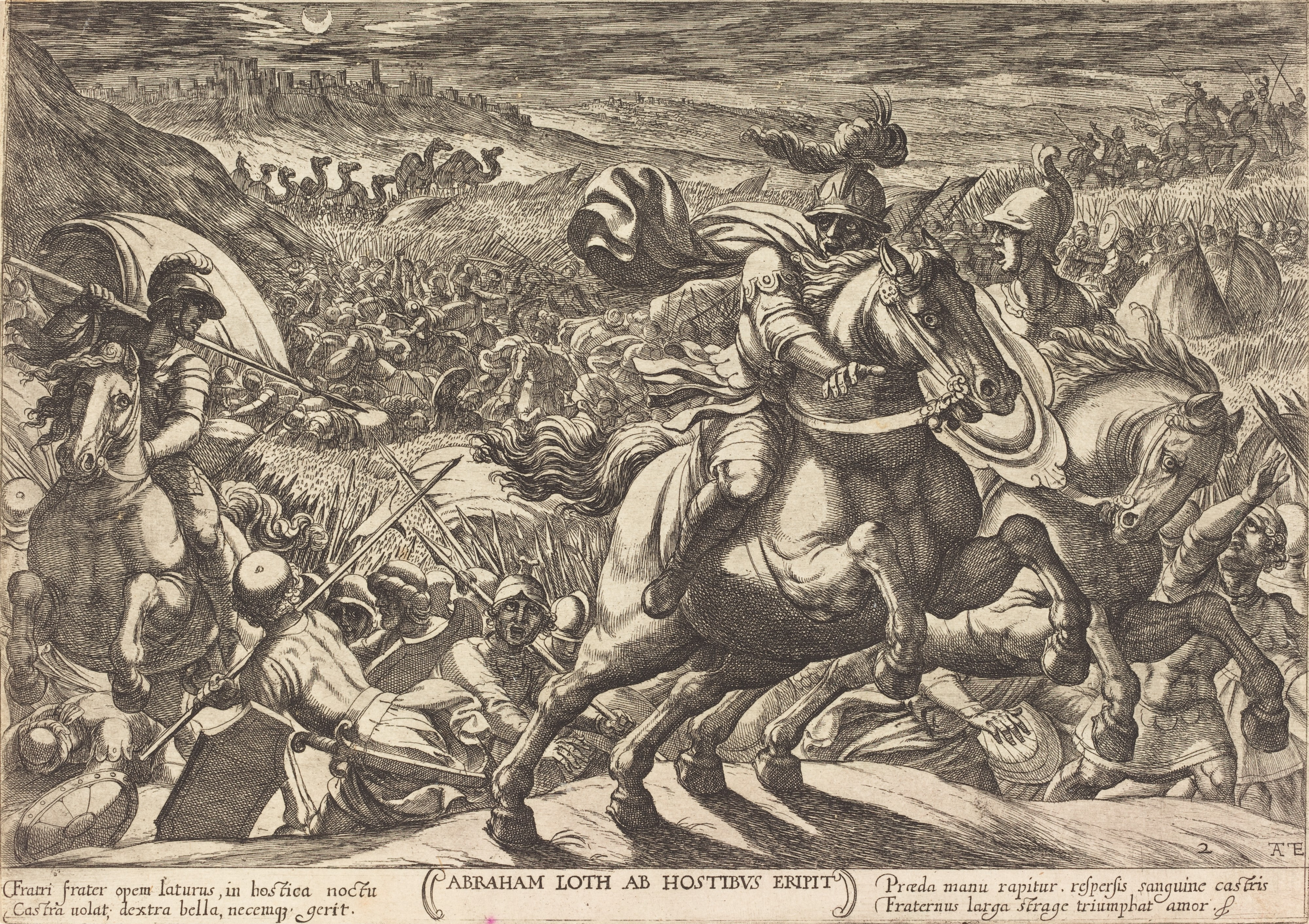
- Abram Makes the Enemies Flee Who Hold His Nephew (1613 etching by Antonio Tempesta at the National Gallery of Art)
Date	Early 2nd millennium BCE
Location	Vale of Siddim (Salt Sea)
Result	Cities of the Jordan plain freed from Mesopotamian control; Lot and captives rescued

Belligerents
Five Cities of the Plain: Sodom; Gomorrah; Admah; Zeboiim; Bela; Unaligned: Abram's 318 elite force	Mesopotamian kingdoms: Elam; Shinar (Sumer); Ellasar (Larsa); Goyim (Hittite Kingdoms)

Commanders and leaders
Five Kings: King Bera; King Birsha; King Shinab; King Shemeber; King of Bela	Four Kings: King Chedorlaomer (Kudurlagamar); King Amraphel (Hamurabi); King Arioch (Eri-Aku); King Tidal (Tudḫaliya)

The Battle of the Vale of Siddim, also often called the War of Nine Kings or the Slaughter of Chedorlaomer, is an event reported in the Hebrew Bible's Book of Genesis, portrayed as taking place during the days of Abram and Lot. The Vale of Siddim was the battleground for the cities of the Jordan River plain which had rebelled against Mesopotamian rule.

Whether this event occurred in history has been disputed by scholars. According to Ronald Hendel, "The current consensus is that there is little or no historical memory of pre-Israelite events in Genesis."

== Background ==
The Book of Genesis explains that during the days of Lot, the Vale of Siddim was a river valley where the Battle of Siddim occurred between four Mesopotamian armies and five cities of the Jordan plain. According to the biblical account, before the destruction of Sodom and Gomorrah, the Elamite King Chedorlaomer and three allied kings had subdued the tribes and cities surrounding the Jordan River plain:

Chedorlaomer and the kings who were with him came and subdued the Rephaim in Ashteroth-karnaim, the Zuzim in Ham, the Emim in Shaveh-kiriathaim, and the Horites in the hill country of Seir as far as El-paran on the edge of the wilderness; then they turned back and came to En-mishpat (that is, Kadesh), and subdued all the country of the Amalekites, and also the Amorites who lived in Hazazon-tamar.

After 12 years of service to Chedorlaomer, four kings of the cities of the Jordan plain revolted against his rule. In response, after two further years, Chedorlaomer and three other kings started a campaign against King Bera of Sodom and four other allied kings.

== Location ==
The Vale of Siddim or Valley of Siddim, Hebrew: עֵ֖מֶק שִׂדִּים ‘emeq haś-Śiddim, equated with the "Salt Sea" in Genesis 14:3, itself equated with the "Sea of the Arabah" in Deuteronomy 3:17, is the same as the "Dead Sea". Genesis 14 also notes that "the vale of Siddim was full of slime pits" or "tar pits".

Siddim is thought to be located on the southern end of the Dead Sea. It has been suggested by theologians that the destruction of the cities of the Jordan Plain by divine fire and brimstone may have caused Siddim to become a salt sea, what is now the Dead Sea.

The Dead Sea is also called the "east sea" in Ezekiel 47:18 (Compare Joel 2:20), Bahr Lut (the Sea of Lut) in Arabic, and Lake Asphaltites in the works of Josephus.

== The battle ==
Four kings' forces were pitched against five. Ryle notes that "The description of the battle itself has most unfortunately not been preserved: ... the narrative is so fragmentary, or condensed, that only the rout is recorded": the Northern forces overwhelmed the Southern kings of the Jordan plain, driving some of them into the asphalt or tar pits that littered the valley.

Those who escaped fled to the mountains, including the kings of Sodom and Gomorrah. Their two cities were then spoiled of their goods and provisions, or possibly their cavalry, (Note: The Septuagint refers to τὴν ἵππον (tēn hippon), "the horses".) and some of their citizens were captured. The other three cities "are passed over in silence". Among the captives was Abram's nephew, Lot.

== Aftermath ==
When word of Lot's capture reached Abram, while he was staying in Elonei Mamre with Aner and Eshcol, he immediately mounted a rescue operation, arming 318 of his trained servants, who went in pursuit of the enemy armies that were returning to their homelands. They caught up with them in the city of Dan, flanking the enemy on multiple sides during a night raid. The attack ran its course as far as Hobah, north of Damascus, where he defeated Chedorlaomer and his forces. Abram recovered all the goods and the captives (including Lot).

The distance between the setting of the battle and the northern points of Dan and Hobah is noteworthy: "that Abram should overtake and smite his enemy at the furthest northern limit of the future Israelite country, is a feature in the story not without symbolical significance. This passage is the only biblical indication that the "entirely peaceable Abraham" took part in a military engagement. (Note: Cf. also Genesis 34:25-29, where "two of the sons of Jacob, Simeon and Levi", take up swords against the city of Shechem.)

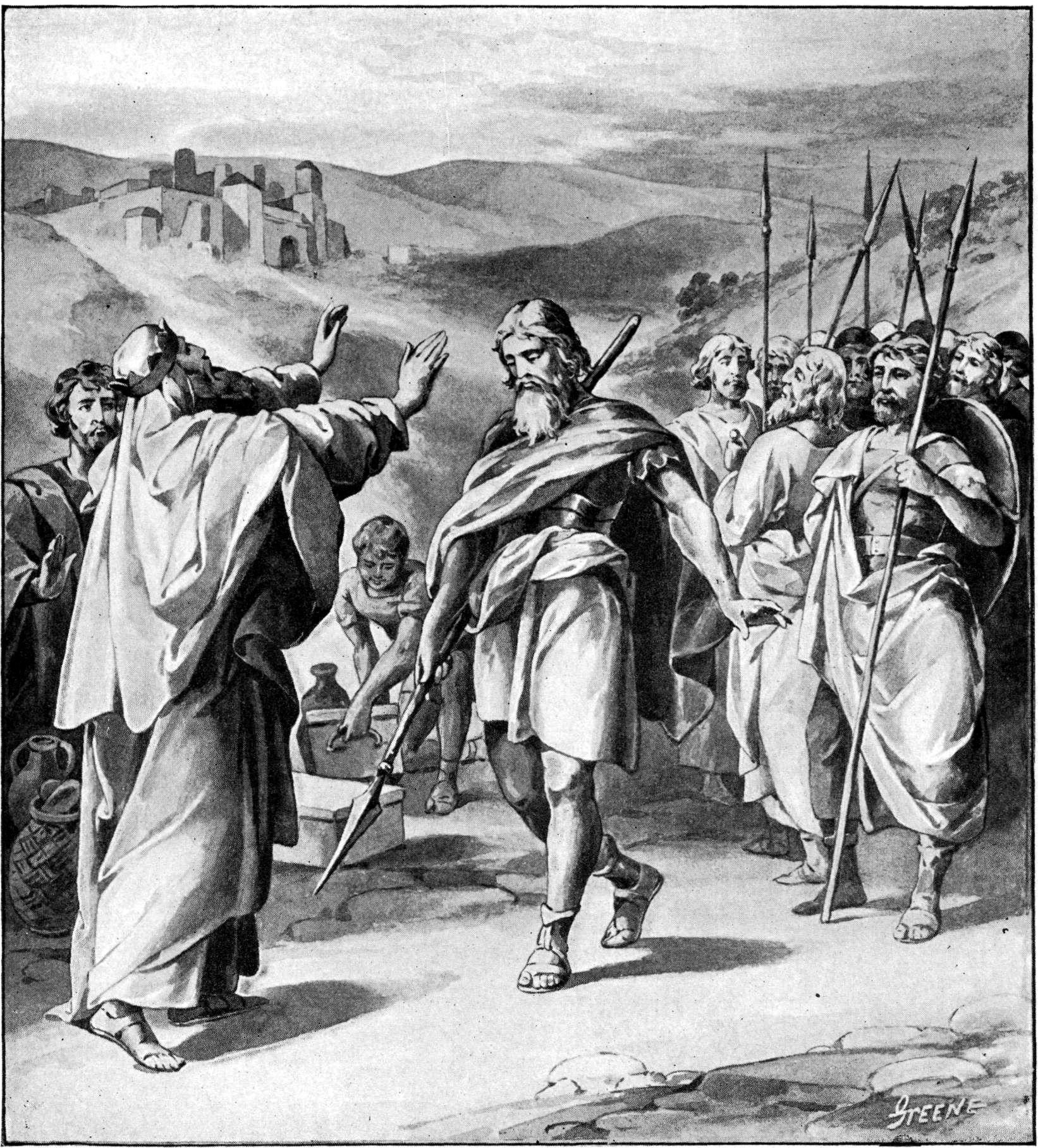
Melchizedek blessing Abram (1897 illustration by Charles Foster)

After this victory, Bera, king of Sodom, met with Abram at the Valley of Shaveh, or the King's Valley. There, Melchizedek, king of Salem, (Note: Not one of the kingdoms counted among Chedorlaomer's allies or those who had rebelled) brought out bread and wine and blessed Abram, who gave him a tenth of the plunder as tithes. Melchizedek is not encountered elsewhere in the Hebrew Bible. Then Bera came to Abram and thanked him, requesting that he keep the plunder but return his people. Abram declined, saying, "I swore I would never take anything from you, so you can never say 'I have made Abram rich.'" What Abram accepted from Bera instead was food for his 318 men and his Amorite neighbours.

== Scholarly analysis ==
=== Identifying the Mesopotamian kings ===
==== Amraphel ====
Amraphel has been thought by some scholars such as the writers of the Catholic Encyclopedia (1907) and The Jewish Encyclopedia (1906) to be an alternate name of the famed Hammurabi. The name is also associated with Ibal-pi-el II of Esnunna. However, this view has been largely abandoned in recent years as there were other kings named Hammurabi in Yamhad and Ugarit. William F. Albright reconstructed the name as Akkadian *Amurru-ippal, *Amurru-apil, *Amurru-apili, or *Amurru-ipul, all of which translate to some variation of "Amurru rewards." Other scholars have identified Amraphel with Aralius, one of the names on the later Babylonian king-lists, attributed first to Ctesias.

David Rohl has argued for an identification with Amar-Sin, the third ruler of the Ur III dynasty. Some suggest that Amraphel is a semitic name that is composed of two elements, "Amar", which was also used by Sumerian King, Amar-Sin, and "a-p-l". John Van Seters, in Abraham in History and Tradition, rejected the historical existence of Amraphel. According to Stephanie Dalley, Amraphel was "[e]ither Hammurabi with an unexplained suffix -el, or Amud-piʾel, king of Qatna, with the common misreading of the letter r for d; possibly a confusion of the two names."

==== Arioch ====
Arioch has been thought to have been a king of Larsa (Ellasar being an alternate version of this). It has also been suggested that it is URU KI, meaning "this place here". Others identify Ellasar with Ilānṣurā which is a city known from second millennium BC Mari archives in the vicinity of north of Mari, and Arioch with Arriuk who appears in Mari archives as a subordinate of Zimri-Lim. The identification of Arioch with the ruler Arriuk mentioned in the Mari archives has been recently supported by the Assyrologists Jean-Marie Durand and Stephanie Dalley. According to Genesis Apocryphon (col. 21), Arioh was king of Cappadocia.

==== Chedorlaomer ====
The Septuagint transcribes Chedorlaomer's name as Khodollogomor, preserving the ancient Hebrew ghayn which had become merged with ayin following the 3rd century BC. Following the discovery of documents written in the Elamite language and Babylonian language, it was thought that Chedorlaomer is a transliteration of the Elamite compound Kudur-Lagamar, meaning servant of Lagamaru – a reference to Lagamaru, an Elamite deity whose existence was mentioned by Ashurbanipal. However, no mention of an individual named Kudur Lagamar has yet been found; inscriptions that were thought to contain this name are now known to have different names (the confusion arose due to similar lettering). According to Dalley, the lack of extrabiblical attestations of the king's name is explained by the fact that there were several concurrent Elamite leaders in the 18th century BC, and that they are commonly referred to by their titles rather than by their names.

In the so-called "Chedorlaomer Tablets", from the Spartoli tablets collection in the British Museum, a "king of Elam" called Kudur-Laḫgumal is mentioned as defeating "Dur-ṣil-ilani, son of Eri-e-Aku" and "Tudḫula, son of Gazza-X". These tablets, written sometime between the 7th and 2nd centuries BC, use cryptic or ambiguous names to refer to kings, as such, Kudur-Laḫgumal is thought to represent the king Kutir-Nahhunte II. Kutir-Nahhunte II reigned in the 11th century BC, hundreds of years after the Battle of Siddim supposedly would have taken place, but his namesake, Kutir-Nahhunte I of the Sukkalmah dynasty, was contemporary with Hammurabi, and indeed, his reign in the 19th—18th century BC would have seen the only time that Elam was one of the dominant powers of Mesopotamia, as to align with its depiction in the Bible.

==== Tidal ====
Tidal, cf. Akkadian tD ("have stretched themselves"), (Note: Akkadian verbal stem intensive, reflexive expressing the bringing about of a state.) has been considered to be a transliteration of Tudhaliya – either referring to the first king of the Hittite New Kingdom (Tudhaliya I) or the proto-Hittite king named Tudhaliya. With the former, the title king of Nations would refer to the allies of the Hittite kingdom such as the Ammurru and Mittani; with the latter the term "goyiim" has the sense of "them, those people". al ("their power") gives the sense of a people or tribe rather than a kingdom. Hence td goyim ("those people have created a state and stretched their power"). Others identify Goyim with the Hittites, Hurrians and other groups in central Anatolia. According to Genesis Apocryphon (col. 21), Goyim was located in the land between the two rivers (i.e., Mesopotamia). Granerød proposes that the Goyim of Tidal could be related to the "islands of nations (goyim)" appearing in Genesis 10:5.

=== Geopolitical context ===
==== Alliances ====
It was common practice for vassals/allies to accompany a powerful king during their conquests. For example, in a letter from about 1770 BCE reporting a speech aimed at persuading the nomadic tribes to acknowledge the authority of Zimri-Lim of Mari:

There is no king who can be mighty alone. Ten or fifteen kings follow Hammurabi the man of Babylon; as many follow Rim-Sin the man of Larsa, Ibal-pi-El the man of Eshnunna, and Amut-pi-El the man of Qatna and twenty kings follow Yarim-Lim the man of Yamhad.

The alliance of four states would have ruled over cities/countries that were spread over a wide area: from Elam at the extreme eastern end of the Fertile Crescent to Anatolia at the western edge of this region. Because of this, there is a limited range of time periods that match the Geopolitical context of Genesis 14. In this account, Chedorlaomer is described as the king to whom the cities of the plain pay tribute. Thus, Elam must be a dominant force in the region and the other three kings would therefore be vassals of Elam and/or trading partners.

==== Trade ====
There were periods when Elam was allied with Mari through trade. Mari also had connections to Syria and Anatolia, who, in turn, had political, cultural, linguistic and military connections to Canaan. The earliest recorded empire was that of Sargon, which lasted until his grandson, Naram Sin.

According to Kenneth Kitchen, a better agreement with the conditions in the time of Chedorlaomer is provided by Ur Nammu. Mari had had links to the rest of Mesopotamia by Gulf trade as early as the Jemdet Nasr period but an expansion of political connections to Assyria did not occur until the time of Isbi-Erra. The Amorites or MARTU were also linked to the Hittites of Anatolia by trade.

Trade between the Harappan culture of India and the Jemdet Nasr flourished between c. 2000–1700 BCE. As Isin declined, the fortunes of Larsa – located between Eshnunna and Elam – rose until Larsa was defeated by Hammurabi. Between 1880 and 1820 BCE there was Assyrian trade with Anatolia, in particular in the metal "annakum", probably tin.

The main trade route between Ashur and Kanesh running between the Tigris and Euphrates passed through Harran. The empire of Shamshi-Adad I and Rim-Sin I included most of northern Mesopotamia. Thus, Kitchen concludes that this is the period in which the narrative of Genesis 14 falls into a close match with the events of the time of Shamsi Adad and Chedorlaomer

==== Rulers in the region in c. 1800 BCE ====
The relevant rulers in the region at this time were:

- The last king of Isin, Damiq-ilishu, ruled 1816–1794
- Rim Sin I of Larsa ruled 1822–1763
- The last king of Uruk, Nabiilishu, ruled 1802
- In Babylon, Hammurabi ruled 1792–1750
- In Eshnunna Ibal Pi-El II ruled c 1762
- In Elam there was a king Kuduzulush
- In Ashur, Shamsi Adad I ruled c 1813-1781
- In Mari, Yasmah-Adad ruled 1796–1780 followed by Zimri-Lim 1779–1757.

=== Dating of events ===
When cuneiform was first deciphered in the 19th century, Theophilus Pinches translated some Babylonian tablets which were part of the Spartoli collection in the British Museum and believed he had found in the "Chedorlaomer Tablets" the names of three of the "Kings of the East" named in Genesis 14. As this is the only part of Genesis which seems to set Abraham in wider political history, it seemed to many 19th and early 20th century exegetes and Assyriologists to offer an opening to date Abraham, if the kings in question could only be identified.

The translation of "Chedorlaomer Tablets" from the Spartoli collection:

With their firm counsel, they established Kudur-Lagamar, king of Elam. Now, one who is pleasing to them [-] will exercise kingship in Babylon, the city of Babylonia (...) What king of Elam is there who provided for Esagila and ... ? The Babylonians ... and [-] their message: “(As for) [the wo]rds that you wrote: ‘I am a king, son of king, of [royal seed e]ternal, [indeed] the son of a king's daughter who sat upon the royal throne. [As for] Dur-ṣil-ilani son of Erie[A]ku, who [carried off] plunder of [-], he sat on the royal throne ... [-] [As for] us, let a king come whose [lineage is] firmly founded] from ancient days, he should be called lord of Babylon (...) When the guardian of well-being cries [-] The protective spirit of Esharra [-] was frightened away. The Elamite hastened to evil deeds, for the Lord devised evil for Babylon. When the protective genius of justice stood aside, the protective spirit of Esharra, temple of all the gods, was frightened away. The Elamite enemy took away his possessions, Enlil, who dwelt therein, became furious. When the heavens (?) changed their appearance, the fiery glare and ill wind obliterated their faces. Their gods were frightened off, they went down to the depths. Whirlwinds, ill wind engulfed the heavens. Anu (the gods') creator had become furious. He diminished their (celestial) appearances, he laid waste (?) his (own celestial) position, with the burning of the shrine E-ana he obliterated its designs. [-] Esharra, the netherworld trembled. [Enlil?] commanded total destruction. [The god had] become furious: he commanded for Sumer the smashing of En[lil]'s land. Which one is Kudur-Lagamar, the evil doer? He called therefore the Umman-man(da he level)led the land of Enlil, he laid waste (?) [-] at their side. When the [-] of Ê-zida, and Nabu, trustee of all [-] hastened to [-] He set [out] downstream, toward the ocean, Ibbi-Tutu, who was on the sea, hastened to the East, He (Nabu) crossed the sea and accupied a dwelling not his own. The rites of E-zida, the sure house, were deathly still. The Elamite [enemy] sent forth his chariotry, he headed dowstream toward Borsippa. He came down the dark way, he entered Borsippa. The vile Elamite toppled its sanctuary, he slew the nobles of ...with weapons, he plundered all the temples. He took their possessions and carried them off to Elam. He destroyed its wall, he filled the land [with weeping ...] (...) an improvident sovereign [-] he felled with weapons Dur-ṣil-ilani son of Eri-[e]Aku, he plundered [-] water over Babylon and Esagila, he slaughtered its [-] with his own weapon like sheep, [-] he burned with fire, old and young, [-] with weapons, [-] he cut down young and old. Tudḫula son of Gazza[-], plundered the [-] water over Babylon and Esagila, [-] his son smote his pate with his own weapon. [-] his lordship to the [rites] of Annunit[um] [king of] Elam [-] plundered the great ..., [-] he sent like the deluge, all the cult centers of Akkad and their sanctuaries he burned [with fi]re Kudur-Lagamar his son c[ut?] his middle and his heart with an iron dagger, [-] his enemy he took and sought out (?). The wicked kings, criminals, [-] captured. The king of the gods, Marduk, became angry at them (...) [The doer] of evil to him [-] his heart [-] the doer of sin must not [-]

In 1887, Schrader was the first to propose that Amraphel could be an alternate spelling for Hammurabi. The terminal -bi on the end of Hammurabi's name was seen to parallel Amraphel since the cuneiform symbol for -bi can also be pronounced -pi. Tablets were known in which the initial symbol for Hammurabi, pronounced as kh to yield Khammurabi, had been dropped, so that Ammurapi was a viable pronunciation. If Hammurabi were deified in his lifetime or soon after (adding -il to his name to signify his divinity), this would produce something close to the Bible's Amraphel. A little later, Jean-Vincent Scheil found a tablet in the Imperial Ottoman Museum in Istanbul from Hammurabi containing a name which he read as Kudur-nuḫgamar, whom he identified as Chedorlaomer, and the Kudur-Lagamar of Pinches' tablet. Thus by the early 20th century many scholars had become convinced that the kings of Gen. 14:1 had been identified, resulting in the following correspondences:

Name from Genesis 14:1	Name from archaeology
Amraphel king of Shinar	Hammurabi (="Ammurapi") king of Sumer
Arioch king of Ellasar	Eri-aku king of Larsa
Chedorlaomer king of Elam (= Chodollogomor in the LXX)	Kudur-Lagamar king of Elam
Tidal, king of nations (i.e. goyim, lit. 'nations')	Tudhaliya I (son of Gazza) king of the Hittites

Today these dating attempts are little more than a historical curiosity. On the one hand, as the scholarly consensus on Near Eastern ancient history moved towards placing Hammurabi in the late 18th century (or even later), and not the 19th, confessional and evangelical theologians found they had to choose between accepting these identifications or accepting the biblical chronology; most were disinclined to state that the Bible might be in error and so began synchronizing Abram with the empire of Sargon I, and the work of Schrader, Pinches and Scheil fell out of favour. Meanwhile, further research into Mesopotamia and Syria in the second millennium BCE undercut attempts to tie Abraham in with a definite century and to treat him as a strictly historical figure, and while linguistically not implausible, the identification of Hammurabi with Amraphel is now regarded as untenable.

One modern interpretation of Genesis 14 is summed up by Michael Astour in The Anchor Bible Dictionary (s.v. "Amraphel", "Arioch" and "Chedorlaomer"), who explains the story as a product of anti-Babylonian propaganda during the 6th century Babylonian captivity of the Jews:

After Böhl's widely accepted, but wrong, identification of ^{m}Tu-ud-hul-a with one of the Hittite kings named Tudhaliyas, Tadmor found the correct solution by equating him with the Assyrian king Sennacherib (see Tidal). Astour (1966) identified the remaining two kings of the Chedorlaomer texts with Tukulti-Ninurta I of Assyria (see Arioch) and with the Chaldean Merodach-baladan (see Amraphel). The common denominator between these four rulers is that each of them, independently, occupied Babylon, oppressed it to a greater or lesser degree, and took away its sacred divine images, including the statue of its chief god Marduk; furthermore, all of them came to a tragic end ... All attempts to reconstruct the link between the Chedorlaomer texts and Genesis 14 remain speculative. However, the available evidence seems consistent with the following hypothesis: A Jew in Babylon, versed in Akkadian language and cuneiform script, found in an early version of the Chedorlaomer texts certain things consistent with his anti-Babylonian feelings.

The "Chedorlaomer tablets" are now thought to be from the 7th or 6th century BCE, a millennium after the time of Hammurabi, but at roughly the time when the main elements of Genesis are thought to have been set down. Another prominent scholar considers a relationship between the tablet and Genesis speculative, but identifies Tudhula as a veiled reference to Sennacherib of Assyria, and Chedorlaomer as "a recollection of a 12th century BCE king of Elam who briefly ruled Babylon." Likewise, in 1898, L. W. King showed that Scheil's reading of Kudur-nuḫgamar on the tablet of Hammurabi was a misreading of the name Inuḫsamar.

The last serious attempt to place a historical Abraham in the second millennium resulted from discovery of the name Abi-ramu on Babylonian contracts of about 2000 BCE, but this line of argument lost its force when it was shown that the name was also common in the first millennium, leaving the patriarchal narratives in a relative biblical chronology but without an anchor in the known history of the Near East.

Some scholars have disagreed: Kitchen asserts that the only known historical period in which a king of Elam, whilst allied with Larsa, was able to enlist a Hittite king and a King of Eshunna as partners and allies in a war against Canaanite cities is in the time of Old Babylon c 1822–1764 BCE. This is when Babylon is under Hammurabi and Rim Sin I (Eri-Aku) controls Mari, which is linked through trade to the Hittites and other allies along the length of the Euphrates. This trade is mentioned in the Mari letters, a source which documents a geo-political relationship back to when the ships of Dilmun, Makkan and Meluhha docked at the quays of Agade in the time of Sargon. In the period of Old Babylon, c 1822–1764 BCE, Rim Sin I (Eri-Aku) brought together kings of Syro-Anatolia whose kingdoms were located on the Euphrates in a coalition focused on Mari whose king was Shamsi Adad. Kitchen uses the geo-political context, the price of slaves and the nature of the covenants entered into by Abraham to date the events he encounters. He sees the covenants, between Abraham and the other characters encountered at various points in Abraham's journeys, as datable textual artifacts having the form of legal documents which can be compared to the form of legal documents from different periods. Of particular interest is the relationship between Abraham and his wife, Sarah. When Sarah proves to be barren, she offers her handmaiden, Hagar, to Abraham to provide an heir. This arrangement, along with other aspects of the covenants of Abraham, lead Kitchen to a relatively narrow date range which he believes aligns with the time of Hammurabi.

== See also ==
- Abram and Chedorlaomer
- Ibrium of Ebla
