= Zuzim (biblical people) =

According to the Hebrew Bible, the Zuzim or Zuzites (Hebrew: זוּזִים, Zūzīm) were a tribe who lived in Ham, a land east of the Jordan River between Bashan and Moab. The etymology of the name is unknown, but may derive from the Hebrew zīz (זִיז) which roughly translates to "moving things"/"things which move" (perhaps "nomad" in this context).

According to the text, the Zuzim were conquered by an invading coalition of kings led by the Elamite King Chedorlaomer (Genesis 14:5). This is the only place in the Hebrew Bible where they are mentioned; however, because they are listed alongside the Emim, which is later described in the Book of Deuteronomy as the Moabite term for rephaim, some scholars identify the Zuzim with the Zamzummim (Deuteronomy 2:20), a tribe of the Rephaim living in the same region later occupied by the Ammonites, who were also described as coterminous with the Emim.
