= Tudhaliya =

Name of several Hittite royals

Tudḫaliya is the name of several Hittite kings or royals. It is not clear how many kings bore that name, and numbering schemes vary from source to source.

- Tudḫaliya (sometimes called Tudḫaliya I) is deduced from his early placement in a later offering list as a hypothetical pre-Empire king who might have reigned in the early 17th century BC.
- Tudḫaliya I (sometimes considered identical with the following, as Tudḫaliya I/II), ruled in the mid-15th century BC, son of Kantuzzili.
- Tudḫaliya II (sometimes considered identical with the preceding, as Tudḫaliya I/II or renumbered as Tudḫaliya I), ruled at the start of the 14th century BC, father-in-law of Arnuwanda I.
- Tudḫaliya III (sometimes renumbered as Tudḫaliya II), in the early 14th century BC, the son of Arnuwanda I and predecessor of Šuppiluliuma I.
- Tudḫaliya the Younger (sometimes numbered as Tudḫaliya III), in the mid-14th century BC, the son of Tudḫaliya III, he probably never reigned.
- Tudḫaliya IV (very rarely renumbered as Tudḫaliya III), ruled around 1230 BC, the son of Ḫattušili III.
- Tudḫaliya V possibly ruled around 1180 BC, perhaps the son of Šuppiluliuma II.
- Tudḫaliya, Neo-Hittite king(s) of Carchemish, fl. c. 1100 BC

== In the Bible ==
Some biblical scholars suggested that Tidal, king of Nations (Goyim), who is mentioned in the Book of Genesis 14 as having joined Chedorlaomer in attacking rebels in Canaan is based on one of the Tudhaliyas. In modern academia, Tidal is considered to be a literary figure, not a historical figure. The discussion about Tidal relates to the Battle of Siddim in the Bible; the exact geographical location of Tidal is disputed. 'Tidal, king of Goyim', may also be related to the island kingdoms in Mediterranean Sea.

== See also ==
- History of the Hittites

== Bibliography ==
- Beckman, Gary (2000), "Hittite Chronology," Akkadica 119-120 (2000) 19–32.
- Breyer, Francis (2010), "Hethitologische Bemerkungen zum Keilschrift "Zipfel" aus Qantir/Pi-Ramesse," Ägypten und Levante 20 (2010) 43-48.
- Bryce, Trevor (2005), The Kingdom of the Hittites, Oxford.
- Forlanini, Massimo (1993), Atti. del II Congresso Internazionale di Hittitologia, Pavia.
- Freu, Jacques, and Michel Mazoyer (2007a), Des origins à la fin de l’ancien royaume hittite, Paris.
- Freu, Jacques, and Michel Mazoyer (2007b), Les débuts du nouvel empire hittite, Paris.
- Zsolt, Simon (2009), "Die ANKARA-Silberschale und das Ende des hethitischen Reiches," Zeitschrift für Assyriologie 99 (2009) 247-269. online

Unknown Last known title holder: Anitta	Hittite king c. 17th century BC	Succeeded by PU-Sarruma (?)
