= Hobah =

Hobah (Hebrew: חובה) was a biblical place mentioned in Genesis 14:15. Possible references to Hobah have been found in other ancient texts, notably in the Book of Judith. Nothing else is known about Hobah, other than that it was located "to the north" of Damascus in Syria.

== Genesis account ==
Hobah is mentioned in the aftermath of the Battle of Siddim in the Book of Genesis, when Abraham (then Abram) rescued his nephew Lot, from those who pillaged Sodom and Gomorrah. The biblical account relates that he pursued Lot's captors, the defeated army of Chedorlaomer, as far north as Hobah.

== Possible references ==
In the deuterocanonical book of Judith, possible references to Hobah are found in Judith 4:4, 15:4 and 15:5. The Greek Septuagint writes the name of this location as either Χωβά (Choba) in chapter 4 or Χωβαι (Chobai) in chapter 15. Both Antoine Augustin Calmet and George Leo Haydock identified this as Hobah, and this identification has some credibility, as the Septuagint Greek of Genesis 14:15 reads Χοβά, an almost identical spelling. Furthermore, in Judith 15:5, the text says, "cut them down as far as Choba". This is the same reading given in Genesis 14:15 regarding how Abraham pursued Lot's captors as far as Hobah.

The Genesis Apocryphon renders this name as Helbon (Hebrew: חֶלְבּוֹן), thus identifying it with the city mentioned in Ezekiel 27:18.

== Identification ==
The Hebrew Masoretic Text and Koine Greek Septuagint say that Hobah is "to the left" of Damascus. This is generally translated to mean "north", as in the Aramaic Targum Onkelos. Although suggestions have been made for the exact location of Hobah, no identification is certain. In his commentary on Genesis, Antoine Augustin Calmet identified Hobah as Abila of Celesyria. The site of Ablia is the village of Souq Wadi Barada (called Abil-es-Suk by early Arab geographers), which is located about twelve miles northwest of Damascus. Calmet specifically noted that Hobah was to the left of the road that leads to Damascus, stating that if Hobah was north of the city, the text would have simply said "beyond Damascus", as can be seen in Amos 5:27 and Judith 15:5. This identification was later republished by George Leo Haydock. Johann Jakob Wettstein identified the Biblical Hobah with the modern Ḥoba, which he places sixty miles north of Damascus. The Keil and Delitzsch Old Testament Commentary of 1865 offers the most detailed theory on its location: “About 1 day’s journey north of Hoba on the road from Hims to Palmyra is a strong spring, which was a land rider station called Bet-Proclis under Roman rule... now all the structures have disappeared there and only the source Ain Forkutus has remained... Likewise, there is now only the Hoba spring without a village”. The Richard von Riess Bible Atlas of 1895 says that Hobah is “west of Karyetain, 111 kilometers northeast of Damascus”.

== See also ==
- Battle of Siddim
- Lot (biblical person)
