= Shinar =

Biblical term for southern Mesopotamia

Cities of Mesopotamia in the 2nd millennium BC

Shin‘ar (Note: /ˈʃaɪnɑːr/ SHY-nar; Hebrew: שִׁנְעָר, romanized: Šīnʿār; Septuagint: Σενναάρ, romanized: Sennaár) is the name for the southern region of Mesopotamia used by the Hebrew Bible.

== Etymology ==
Hebrew שנער Šinʿār is equivalent to the Egyptian Sngr and Hittite Šanḫar(a), all referring to southern Mesopotamia. Some Assyriologists considered Šinʿār a western variant or cognate of Šumer (Sumer), with their original being the Sumerians' own name for their country, ki-en-gi(-r), but this is "beset with philological difficulties". Another hypothesis derives the name from a Kassite tribe known as the Šamharu, whose name would have been later used for Babylonia in general.

Sayce (1895) identified Shinar as cognate with the following names: Sangara/Sangar mentioned in the context of the Asiatic conquests of Thutmose III (15th century BC); Sanhar/Sankhar of the Amarna letters (14th century BC); the Greeks' Singara; and modern Sinjar, in Upper Mesopotamia, near the Khabur River. Accordingly, he proposed that Shinar was in Upper Mesopotamia, but acknowledged that the Bible gives important evidence that it was in the south. Albright (1924) suggested identification with the Kingdom of Ḫana.

== Hebrew Bible ==
The name Šinʿār occurs eight times in the Hebrew Bible in which it refers to Babylonia. That location of Shinar is evident from its description as encompassing both Babel/Babylon (in northern Babylonia) and Erech/Uruk (in southern Babylonia). In the Book of Genesis 10:10, the beginning of Nimrod's kingdom is said to have been "Babel [Babylon], and Erech [Uruk], and Akkad, and Calneh, in the land of Shinar." Verse 11:2 states that Shinar enclosed the plain that became the site of the Tower of Babel after the Great Flood.

In Genesis 14:1,9, King Amraphel rules Shinar. It is further mentioned in Joshua 7:21; Isaiah 11:11; Daniel 1:2; and Zechariah 5:11, as a general synonym for Babylonia.

== Jubilees ==
The Book of Jubilees 9:3 allots Shinar (or, in the Ethiopic text, Sadna Sena`or) to Ashur, son of Shem. Jubilees 10:20 states that the Tower of Babel was built with bitumen from the sea of Shinar.

== In popular culture ==
The region's name in its Greek form is used in the title of Chants of Sennaar, a video game that draws motifs from the Tower of Babel narrative.
