= Arioch =

King of Ellasar mentioned in the Hebrew Bible

King of Ellasar
- Reign: Early 2nd millennium BCE

Arioch (Hebrew: אַרְיוֹךְ, romanized: ’Aryōḵ) appears in Genesis 14 as the name of the King of Ellasar (Hebrew: אֶלָּסָר) who participated in the Battle of Siddim. Led by Chedorlaomer, the four kings Amraphel, Arioch, Chedorlaomer, and Tidal engaged in a punitive expedition against five kings of Canaan who rebelled against Chedorlaomer, namely Bera of Sodom, Birsha of Gomorrah, Shinab of Admah, Shemeber of Zeboim, and Zoar of Bela. The same story is also mentioned in the Book of Jubilees, where Arioch is called "king of Sellasar". According to Genesis Apocryphon (col. 21), Arioch was king of Cappadocia.

== Arioch and Ellasar ==
Some historians have placed the area where Arioch ruled in Anatolia, but theories as to its specific locations differ, with some claiming it was in Pontus while others cite Cappadocia and Antioch.

There are also sources which associated Ellasar with the kingdom of Larsa and suggested that Arioch could be one of its kings called Eri-Aku, an epithet of either Warad-Sin or Rim-Sîn I, since both are described as son of Kudur-Mabuk.

By the 20th century, this theory became popular so that it was common to identify Arioch with Eriaku through the alternative reading of either Rim-Sîn or his brother Warad-Sin, who were both believed to be contemporary with Hammurabi.

Others identify Ellasar with Ilānṣurā, which is a city known from the second millennium BC Mari archives in the vicinity of the north of Mari, Syria, and Arioch with Arriuk, who appears in the Mari archives as a subordinate of Zimri-Lim. The identification of Arioch with the ruler Arriuk mentioned in the Mari archives has been recently supported by the Assyrologists Jean-Marie Durand and Stephanie Dalley.

Some modern scholars consider Arioch as a literary figure, not a historical figure, but in the case of Ellasar, they connect it to the name Alashiya, not Larsa or Cappadocia. Ellasar is related to the name of Elishah in Genesis 10:4, which is why it is presumed to have referred to Alashiya, an ancient kingdom on Cyprus. The name Arioch could have originated from the foreigner or foreign story that Jewish people learnt from the foreign diaspora community, which included Elamites and many other foreigners, as mentioned in Ezra 4.

== Adaptations by later writers ==
Arioch was a name for a fictional demon, and also appears as the name of a demon in many grimoires. Arioch is also named in John Milton's Paradise Lost (vi. 371.) as one of the fallen angels under Satan's command.

Arioch is one of the principal lords of Chaos in several of Michael Moorcock's fantasy series.

Arioch is one of the seventeen megatherians mentioned in Gene Wolfe's Briah Cycle.
