= Stephanie Dalley =

British scholar of the Ancient Near East

Stephanie Mary Dalley
- Born: Stephanie Mary Page; March 1943 (age 83)
- Title: Former Shillito Fellow in Assyriology; Honorary Senior Fellow of Somerville College; Fellow of the Society of Antiquaries
- Spouse: Christopher Dalley

Academic background
- Education: University of Cambridge; SOAS

Academic work
- Discipline: Assyriology; Archaeology
- Institutions: University of Oxford (Faculty of Oriental Studies, Somerville College)

Stephanie Mary Dalley FSA (née Page; March 1943) is a British Assyriologist and scholar of the Ancient Near East. Prior to her retirement, she was a teaching Fellow at the Oriental Institute, Oxford. She is known for her publications of cuneiform texts and her investigation into the Hanging Gardens of Babylon, and her proposal that it was situated in Nineveh, and constructed during Sennacherib's rule.

== Biography ==
As a schoolgirl, Stephanie Page worked as a volunteer on archaeological excavations at Verulamium, Cirencester, and Bignor Villa. In 1962, she was invited by David Oates, a family friend, to an archaeological dig he was directing in Nimrud, northern Iraq. Here she was responsible for cleaning and conserving the discovered ivories. Between 1962 and 1966 she studied Assyriology at Newnham College, Cambridge, part of Cambridge University, and followed it up with a PhD from the School of Oriental and African Studies, London.

In the years 1966–67, Page was awarded a Fellowship by the British School of Archaeology in Iraq, and she worked at the excavation at Tell al-Rimah as Epigrapher and registrar. The tablets excavated at Tell al-Rimah formed the subject of her PhD thesis and later for a book for general readership, Mari and Karana, two Old Babylonian Cities. In Iraq she met Christopher Dalley, now a Chartered Engineer, whom she later married. Then they had three children.

From 1979 to 2007, Dalley taught Akkadian and Sumerian at the Oriental Institute, Oxford University, being appointed Shillito Fellow in Assyriology in 1988. She is an Honorary Senior Research Fellow of Somerville College, a member of Common Room at Wolfson College, and a Fellow of the Society of Antiquaries.

Dalley took part in archaeological excavations in the Aegean, Iraq, Syria, Jordan and Turkey. She has published extensively, both technical editions of texts from excavations and national museums, and more general books. She has been involved in several television documentaries.

== Contributions to Assyriology ==
=== Mythology ===
Dalley published her own translations of the main Babylonian myths: Atrahasis, Anzu, The Descent of Ishtar, Gilgamesh, The Epic of Creation, Erra and Ishum. Collected into one volume, this work has made the Babylonian corpus accessible for the first time to the student of general mythology and it is widely used in university teaching.

=== The Nimrud Princesses ===
In 1989 the Iraqi Department of Antiquities excavated one of a series of tombs in the ancient Palace of Nimrud. A sarcophagus contained the skeletons of two women who had been buried with over 26 kg of gold objects, many of them inscribed. The inscriptions identified the women as queens from c 700 BC. Dalley showed that the name Ataliya was of Hebrew origin. The name of the other queen, Yaba could also have been Hebrew, a word possibly meaning Beautiful and equating to another, Assyrian name form Banitu which is also found on the jewellery. She concluded that these women, probably mother and daughter as they had been buried together, were Judean princesses, probably relatives of King Hezekiah of Jerusalem, given in diplomatic marriage to the Assyrian Kings. This arrangement sheds a new light on the political relationships between Judah and Assyria at that time. The analysis also offers an explanation for an otherwise obscure passage in the Old Testament (II Kings 18.17–28 and also Isaiah 36.11–13). The besieging Assyrian commander, who would have been a close relative of the King, calls on the people of Jerusalem advising them to abandon their rebellion. "Then Rab-shakeh stood, and cried with a loud voice in the Jews' language, and said 'Hear ye the words of the great king, the King of Assyria'". He could speak in Hebrew because he had learned it at his mother's knee.

=== Legacy in later cultures ===
In several academic articles Dalley has traced the influence of Mesopotamian culture in the Hebrew Old Testament, early Greek epics, and the Arabian Nights. In particular she has studied the transmission of the story of Gilgamesh across the cultures of the Near and Middle East and shown its persistence to the Tale of Buluqiya in the Arabian Nights, examining the evidence for Gilgamesh and Enkidu in the tale, as well as contrasting Akkadian and later Arabic stories. She has also noted the appearance of the name Gilgamesh in the Book of Enoch.

=== Hanging Garden of Babylon ===
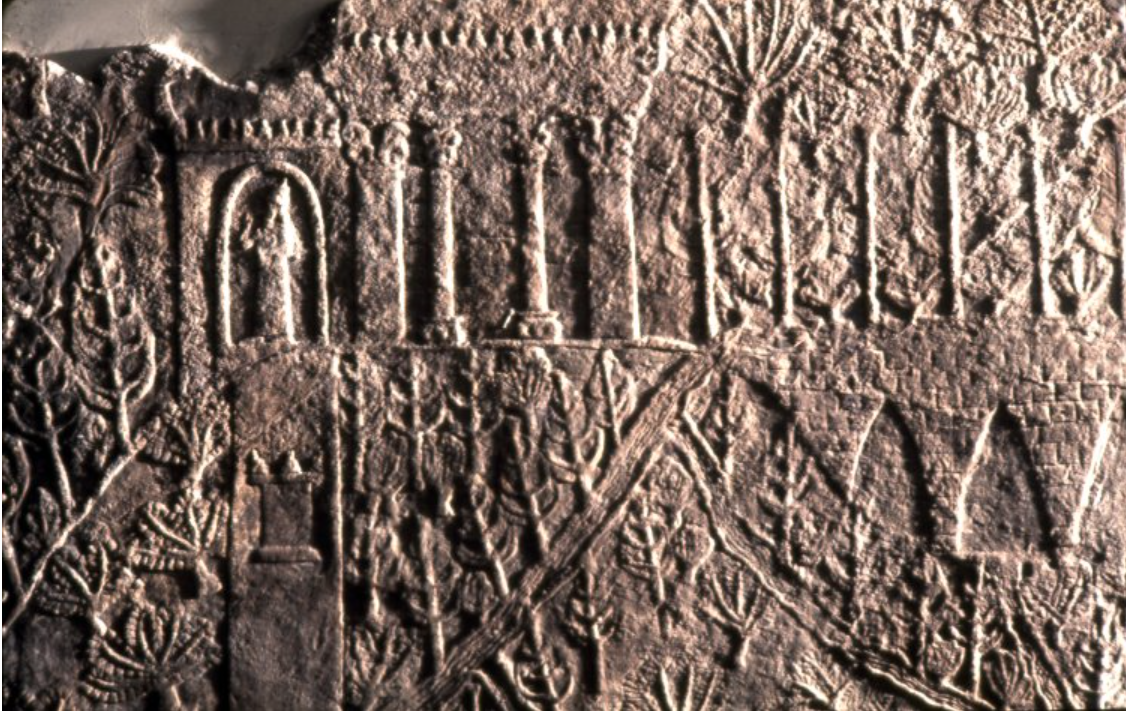
Photo of the Assyrian wall relief showing a garden in the ancient city of Nineveh (Mosul, Iraq)

One of the seven wonders of the ancient world, the Hanging Gardens of Babylon were not found despite extensive archaeological excavations. Dalley has suggested, based on eighteen years of textual study, that the Garden was built not at Babylon under Nebuchadnezzar, but in Nineveh, the capital of the Assyrians, by Sennacherib, around 2700 years ago. She deciphered Babylonian and Assyrian cuneiform, and reinterpreted later Greek and Roman texts, and determined that a crucial seventh century BC inscription had been mistranslated. While none of Nebuchadnezzar's inscriptions ever mentioned any gardens, Dalley found texts by Sennacherib about a palace he built and a garden alongside that he called a wonder for all people. The texts also described a water screw, pre-dating Archimedes, using a new bronze-casting methodology that raised water all day, and related these to extensive aqueducts and canals that brought water from hills eighty kilometres away. A bas-relief from Nineveh and now in the British Museum depicts a palace and trees suspended on terraces, which Dalley used as further supporting evidence. Her research confirms the description of later Greek writers that the gardens were, in fact, terraces built up like an amphitheatre around a central pond. She compiled these conclusions into her book The Mystery of the Hanging Garden of Babylon: An Elusive World Wonder Traced, published in 2013.

=== The Sealand ===
Dalley published in 2009 an archive of some 470 newly found cuneiform texts and deduced that they had originated in a southern Mesopotamian kingdom previously known only as the Sea land which flourished c 1,500 BC. This fills a significant gap in modern historical knowledge. Her analysis of the texts has made it possible to identify tablets in other museums and collections as being from the Sealand dynasties.

=== The Golden bowl of Hasanlu ===
In 1958 a gold beaker was discovered during excavations near the town of Naghadeh in North-western Iran. The beaker weighs 946g and is decorated with over 20 motifs which are repoussee and incised. Combining Sumerian, Akkadian, Hittite, Greek and biblical sources, Dalley showed that each motif could be related to an episode in the Epic of Gilgamesh. As not all these episodes are contained in the "Standard Version", and as the style of decoration is not Mesopotamian, the beaker is evidence that the Epic of Gilgamesh had spread well beyond Mesopotamian civilisations. Hasanlu lay within the kingdom of Mannay, at some times a vassal state of the Assyrian Empire, and a beaker of such value may have been used only at state banquets at which a recital of the Epic was performed. This example of a gold vessel decorated with themes from myth may be a precursor of the imputed gold vessels which inspired similarly decorated Greek pottery of the 5th C BC.

== Selected publications ==
=== Books ===
- Mari and Karana: Two Old Babylonian Cities. Longman. 1984. ISBN 978-0582783638.
- The Tablets from Fort Shalmaneser (Cuneiform Texts from Nimrud). The British School of Archaeology in Iraq. 1984. ISBN 978-0903472081.
- Myths from Mesopotamia: Creation, The Flood, Gilgamesh, and Others. Oxford. 1998. ISBN 978-0192835895.
- The Legacy of Mesopotamia. Oxford. 2005. ISBN 978-0199291588. (Editor)
- Esther's Revenge at Susa: From Sennacherib to Ahasuerus. Oxford. 2007. ISBN 978-0199216635.
- Babylonian Tablets from the First Sealand Dynasty. CDL Press. 2009. ISBN 978-1934309-087.
- The Mystery of the Hanging Garden of Babylon: An Elusive World Wonder Traced. Oxford. 2013. ISBN 978-0199662265.
- The City of Babylon: A History, c.2000BC-AD116. Cambridge. 2021. ISBN 978-1-10713627-4.
- The City of Babylon: A History, c.2000BC-AD116. Cambridge. 2021. ISBN 978-1-316-50177-1. (paperback)

=== Papers ===
- Page, Stephanie (Spring 1968). "The Tablets from Tell Al-Rimah 1967: A Preliminary Report". Iraq. 30 (1): 87–97. doi:10.2307/4199841. JSTOR 4199841. S2CID 140186570.
- Dalley, Stephanie (1980). "Old Babylonian Dowries". Iraq. 42 (1): 53–74. doi:10.2307/4200115. JSTOR 4200115. S2CID 163871506.
- Dalley, Stephanie (January 1985). "Foreign Chariotry and Cavalry in the Armies of Tiglath-Pileser III and Sargon II". Iraq. 47: 31–48. doi:10.2307/4200230. JSTOR 4200230. S2CID 162367249.
- Dalley, Stephanie (January 1986). "The God Ṣalmu and the Winged Disk". Iraq. 48: 85–101. doi:10.2307/4200253. JSTOR 4200253. S2CID 162233850.
- Dalley, Stephanie (January 1990). "Yahweh in Hamath in the 8th Century BC: Cuneiform Material and Historical Deductions". Vetus Testamentum. 40 (1): 21–32. doi:10.2307/1519260. JSTOR 1519260.
- Dalley, Stephanie (1991). "Ancient Assyrian Textiles and the Origins of Carpet Design". Iran. 29: 117–135. doi:10.2307/4299853. JSTOR 4299853.
- Dalley, Stephanie (1993). "Nineveh after 612 BC". Altorientalische Forschungen. 20 (1). doi:10.1524/aofo.1993.20.1.134. S2CID 163383142.
- Dalley, Stephanie (January 1994). "Nineveh, Babylon and the Hanging Gardens: cuneiform and classical sources reconciled". Iraq. 56: 45–58. doi:10.1017/S0021088900002801. S2CID 194106498.
- Dalley, Stephanie (December 1999). "Sennacherib and Tarsus". Anatolian Studies. 49: 73–80. doi:10.2307/3643063. JSTOR 3643063. S2CID 162371873.
- Dalley, Stephanie; Oleson, John Peter (January 2003). "Sennacherib, Archimedes, and the Water Screw: The Context of Invention in the Ancient World". Technology and Culture. 44 (1): 1–26. doi:10.1353/tech.2003.0011. S2CID 110119248.
- Dalley, Stephanie (2013). "Gods from north-eastern and north-western Arabia in cuneiform texts from the First Sealand Dynasty, and a cuneiform inscription from Tell en-Naṣbeh, c.1500 BC". Arabian Archaeology and Epigraphy. 24 (2): 177–185. doi:10.1111/aae.12005.
- "Review of Andre Salvini, ed. La Tour de Babylone; Etudes et recherches sur les monuments de Babylon". Bibliotheca Orientalis. LXXII: 751–755. 2015.
- Mizzi, Dennis; Vella, Nicholas C.; Zammit, Martin R. (2017). "The Cuneiform inscriptions found at Tas-Silg (Malta); banded agate, "targets" and "cushions"". Ancient Near Eastern Studies. supplement 50, in honour of Anthony Frendo: 21–28. ISBN 978-90-4293419-1.
- Heffron, Yağmur; Stone, Adam; Worthington, Martin, eds. (2017). At the Dawn of History. Ancient Near Eastern Studies in Honour of J N Postgate. Vol. Of arches, vaults and domes. Eisenbrauns. pp. 127–131. ISBN 9781575064710.
- Parham, John; Westling, Louise, eds. (2017). "The natural world in ancient Mesopotamian literature". A Global History of Literature and the Environment. Cambridge University Press. pp. 21–36. ISBN 978-1-107-10262-0.
- Sherratt, Susan; Bennet, John, eds. (2017). "Gilgamesh and heroes at Troy: myth, history and education". Archaeology and Homeric Epic. Oxbow Books. pp. 116–134. ISBN 978-1-78570-295-2.
- Frahm, Eckart, ed. (2017). "Assyrian Warfare". A Companion to Assyria. John Wiley & Sons. pp. 522–533. ISBN 978-1-444335934.
- Paulus, Susanne; Clayden, Tim, eds. (2020). "The First Sealand Dynasty: Literacy Economy and the Likely Location of Dur-Enlil(e) in Southern Mesopotamia at the End of the Old Babylonian Period". Babylonia under the Sealand and Kassite Dynasties. De Gruyter. pp. 9–27. ISBN 978-1-5015-1706-8.
- Dalley, Stephanie (2020). "asur nisirti / bit nisirti in the context of the early zodiac". Nouvelles Assyriologiques Brèves et Utilitaires. June: 77.
- "Babylon: Some Problems with Evidence". Bibliotheca Orientalis. 79 (5–6): 427–445. 2022. ISSN 0006-1913.
- Wilson, Karen; Bekken, Deborah, eds. (2023). "Kish and Hursagkalama: an assessment of the cities' history and cults in the light of information from cuneiform texts". Where Kingship descended from Heaven. Studies on Ancient Kish. Vol. Studies in Ancient Cultures 1. University of Chicago. pp. 23–48. ISBN 978-1-61491-092-3.

=== Radio and television ===
- BBC Horizon "Noah's Flood", 1996
- BBC Secrets of the Ancients episode 5: "Hanging Gardens of Babylon", 1999
- BBC Radio, "Babylon and the Gilgamesh Epic". 2006
- BBC Masterpieces of the British Museum, Series 2 Episode 1, "The Assyrian Lion Hunt Reliefs", 2006
- Channel 4 UK: "Secrets of the Dead, The Lost Gardens of Babylon", 2013
- PBS Secrets of the Dead, "The Lost Gardens of Babylon", 2014
- Gilgamesh in Sydney https://www.youtube.com/watch?v=k8pMllSmx4E
