= Admah =

One of a cluster of five biblical cities

According to the Hebrew Bible, Admah (Heb. אַדְמָה) was one of the five cities of the Vale of Siddim. Its king, at the time of the Battle of Siddim, was Shinab. The city was destroyed along with Sodom and Gomorrah.

== Location ==
Admah is supposed by William F. Albright to be the same as the "Adam" of Joshua 3:16. The location of Admah is unknown, although Bryant G. Wood a proponent of the southern theory for the Cities of the Plain identified the site with Numeira, but later changed it to Khirbat al-Khanazir Jordan, although it was only a cemetery during the Bronze Age and proponents of the northern theory for the Cities of the Plain identify the site with Tel Nimrin, Jordan.

The town is mentioned figuratively in the Book of Deuteronomy, and in the Book of Hosea.

== Eblaite references ==
There has also been some conjecture that Admah is mentioned in the Ebla tablets as the Eblaite word "ad-ma" or "ad-mu-utki" = (Town of) Admah.

== See also ==
- Sodom and Gomorrah - two of the five "cities of the plain"
- Zeboim - one of the five "cities of the plain"
- Zoar, former Bela - one of the five "cities of the plain"
