= Nancy Lapp =

American archaeologist and biblical scholar (1930–2025)

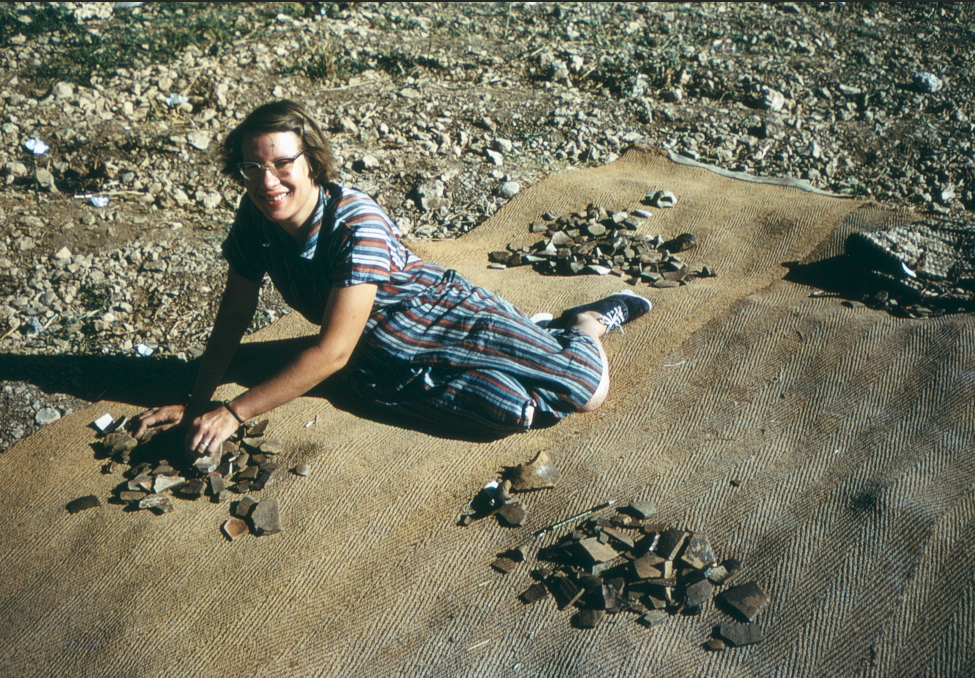
- Lapp sorting pottery at Iraq al-Amir (1961–62)
- Born: February 11, 1930
- Died: March 3, 2025 (aged 95)
- Spouse: Paul Lapp
- Scientific career
- Fields: Archaeology

Nancy L. Lapp (née Renn, February 11, 1930 – March 3, 2025) was an American archaeologist and biblical scholar who had worked on a number of sites in Jordan and Palestine, alongside her husband, Paul Lapp. After her husband's untimely death in 1970 in a tragic swimming accident, she dedicated herself to publishing all of their excavation reports. Lapp became curator of Pittsburgh Theological Seminary's Museum of Near Eastern Archaeology in 1970, and in 2000 became Curator Emerita. She also served as a Trustee Emerita of the American Center of Oriental Research (ACOR) in Amman, Jordan, to which she had donated an expansive collection of photographs documenting her and Paul's travels and archaeological expeditions.

Lapp had a bachelor's degree from the University of Cincinnati and a master's degree from McCormick Theological Seminary. At the encouragement of her professors, G. Ernest Wright and Frank Moore Cross, she became secretary and the first female research assistant to Dr. William F. Albright at Johns Hopkins University between 1955 and 1957. It was during this time that she met and married Paul Lapp. In 1957, Nancy and Paul joined the Drew-McCormick Archaeological Expedition to Shechem, where they received training in excavation technique and ceramic typology from G. Ernest Wright, Lawrence Toombs, and Ovid Sellers. Nancy and Paul "soon came to be recognized as a very promising team of biblical archaeologists."

From 1960 to 1965, Paul was director of the American School of Oriental Research (ASOR) in Jerusalem (today the W.F. Albright Institute of Archaeological Research). Lapp was heavily involved with keeping the Institute running smoothly, as well as assisting with the numerous excavations Paul initiated during this time, all while raising their five children. After Paul stepped down as director in 1965, the Lapps continued to live and work from ASOR, and Paul began work at the Early Bronze Age site of Bab edh-Dhra. This project later evolved into the Expedition to the Dead Sea Plain project (EDSP), excavations in which Lapp continued to participate from 1970 through their final season in 1990.

In 1970, Lapp began working at Pittsburgh Theological Seminary (PTS) in Pittsburgh, Pennsylvania. She lectured and worked as Curator of the university's Kelso Bible Lands Museum (now renamed the Kelso Museum of Near Eastern Archaeology). In 2000, Lapp retired and became Curator Emerita of the museum but did not stop her publication work, receiving funding from various grants and fellowships.

When Lapp's husband died in 1970 with nearly all of his excavations unpublished, Lapp resolved to publish them herself. Among the many archaeological sites that Paul Lapp had worked on were "Iraq al-Amir [near Wadi as-Seer], Tell er-Rumeith [near Irbid], Bab edh-Dhra [near the Dead Sea], and Tell Taanach/Ta’anak [near Jenin, Palestine]." As of June 2019, she had largely completed this endeavor.

A collection of the Lapps' Jordan and Middle East photography is available on the American Center of Oriental Research's ACOR Photo Archive.

Lapp died on March 3, 2025, at the age of 95.

== Selected publications ==
- 1958, A Comparative Study of a Hellenistic Pottery Group from Beth-zur, American Schools of Oriental Research, 1958.
- 1968, The 1957 Excavation at Beth-zur, Cambridge, MA: American Schools of Oriental Research, 1968 (with Seller, O.R., Funk, R.W., McKenzie, J.L., Lapp, P.W.).
- 1968, Iron II- Hellenistic Pottery Groups, American Schools of Oriental Research, 1968 (with Lapp, P.W.).
- 1974, Discoveries in the Wadi ed-Daliyeh, Cambridge, MA: American Schools of Oriental Research, 1974 (with Lapp, P.W.).
- 1981, The Third Campaign at Tell el-Ful: the excavations of 1964, Cambridge, MA: American Schools of Oriental Research, 1981 (with Graham, J.A.).
- 1983, The Excavations at Araq el-Emir, Ann Arbor, MI: American Schools of Oriental Research, 1983 (with Brown, R.)
- 1989, Cylinder Seals and Impressions of the Third Millennium B.C. from the Dead Sea Plain, American Schools of Oriental Research, 1989.
- 2003, Preliminary excavation reports and other archaeological investigations: Tell Qarqur, Iron I sites in the North-Central highlands of Palestine, Boston, MA: American Schools of Oriental Research, 2003.
- 2008, Shechem IV: the Persian-Hellenistic Pottery of Shechem/Tell Balat'ah, Boston, MA: American Schools of Oriental Research, 2008 (with Campell, E.F. Jr.).
- 2014 Tell er-Rumeith: The Excavations of Paul Lapp, 1962 and 1967, Boston, MA: American Schools of Oriental Research, 2014 (with Barako, T.J. ).
