= Zeboim =

Zeboim can refer to a number of things:

- Zeboim (Hebrew Bible), a location mentioned in the Hebrew Bible
- Zeboim, a location in the game Xenogears
- Zeboim, a divinity in the fictional Dragonlance universe
