= Sodom and Gomorrah =

Cities destroyed by God in the Book of Genesis

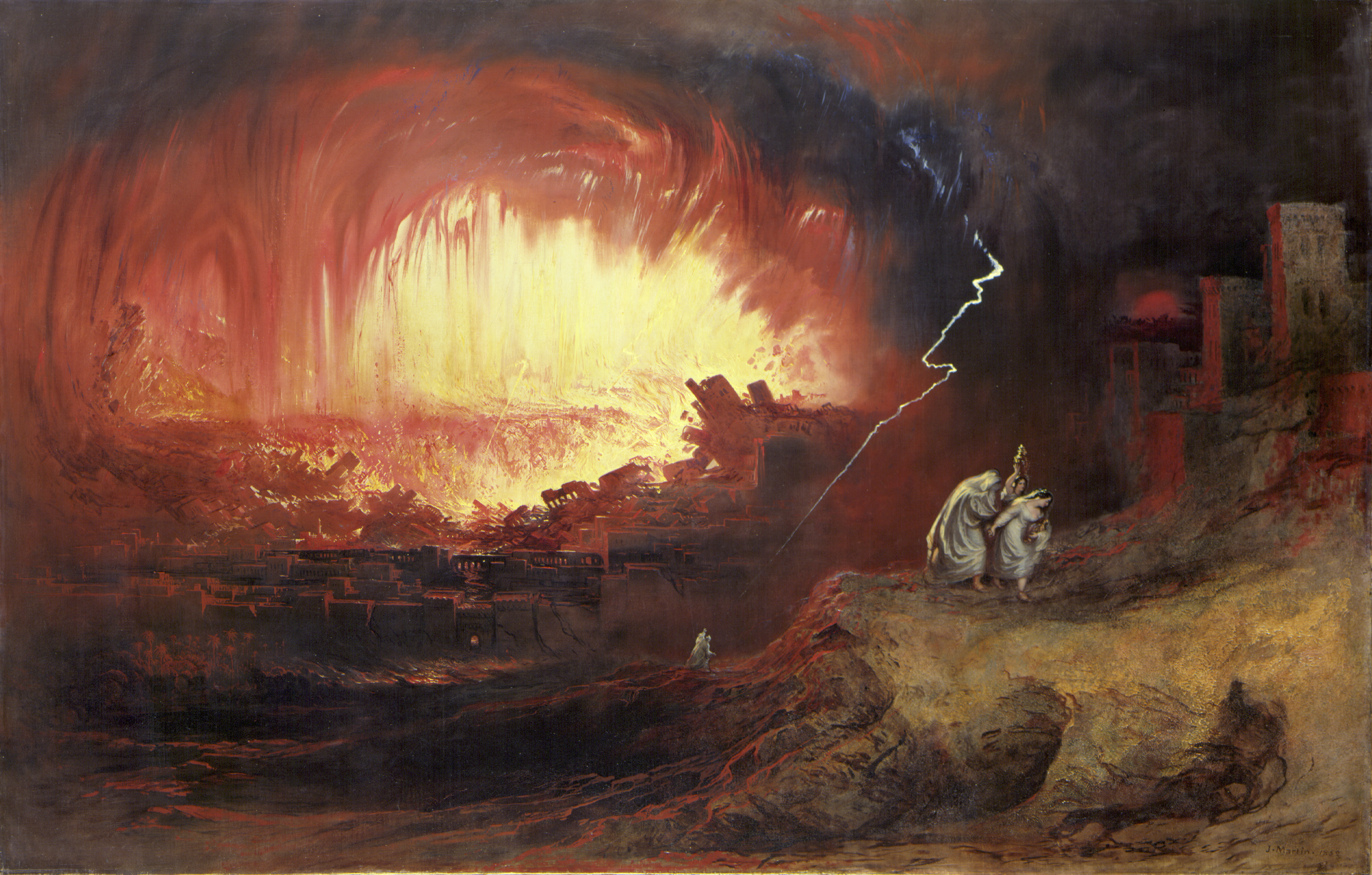
Sodom and Gomorrah (1852) by John Martin

In the Abrahamic religions, Sodom (/ˈsɒdəm/) and Gomorrah (/ɡəˈmɒrə/) were two cities destroyed by God for their wickedness. Their story parallels the Genesis flood narrative in its theme of God's anger provoked by man's sin (see Genesis 19:1–28). They are mentioned frequently in the Nevi'im section of the Hebrew Bible as well as in the New Testament as symbols of human wickedness and divine retribution, and the Quran contains a version of the story about the two cities.

These cities are depicted as two of the "cities of the plain" involved in Abraham and Lot's story, including rebellion against Chedorlaomer and their eventual rescue by Abraham. Sodom and Gomorrah are later destroyed by God after their pervasive wickedness, with Lot and his daughters spared while Lot's wife is turned into a pillar of salt for disobeying God's order to not look back.

Biblical and deuterocanonical texts expand on the story, portraying Sodom and Gomorrah as symbols of sin, often linked to adultery, arrogance, inhospitality, and oppression of the poor, rather than explicitly sexual immorality. References in the New Testament, including Matthew, Luke, Jude, and Revelation, use the cities as warnings of divine judgment, with some interpretations highlighting sexual transgressions, while others emphasize violence, injustice, and violations of hospitality. Scholars debate the precise nature of the sins, noting that the Hebrew term "'yada'" (to "know") in Genesis 19:5 could imply sexual assault but may also be interpreted as a demand to interrogate or dominate visitors, reflecting the cities' moral corruption more broadly.

Historically, Sodom and Gomorrah may have been based on real locations along the Dead Sea, with sites like Bab edh-Dhra and Numeira suggested as possible candidates, though archaeological evidence is inconclusive. Religious interpretations vary: Judaism often stresses cruelty, arrogance, and inhospitality as the cities' sins, while Christianity and Islam debate the relative importance of sexual immorality versus violent, inhospitable behavior, with these traditions also discussing homosexual transgression and disobedience to God. Gnostic texts, in contrast, present the cities as containing secret knowledge, and their destruction is a consequence of the spiritual ignorance and demonically influenced nature of the Demiurge.

== Etymology ==
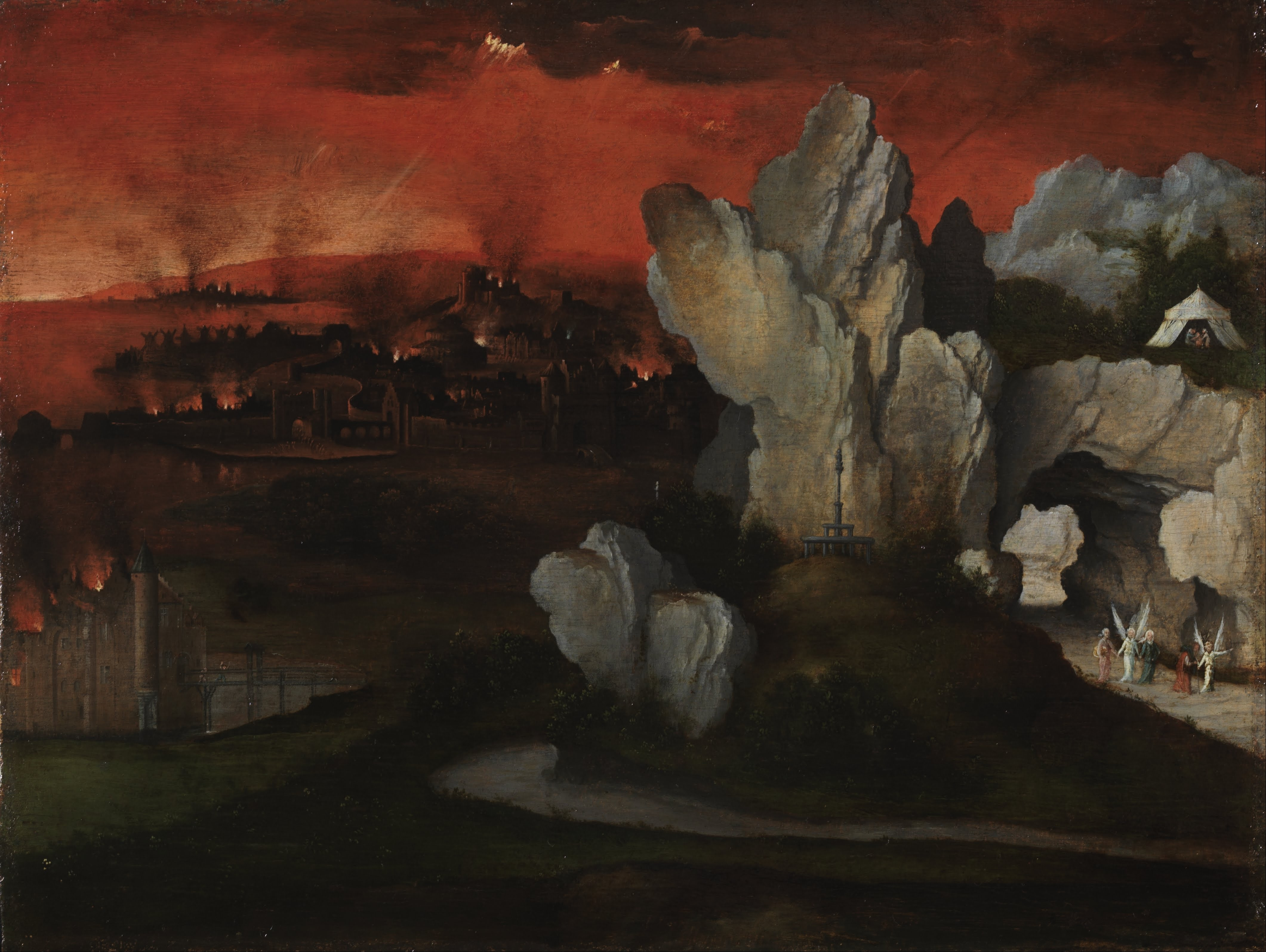
Landscape with the Destruction of Sodom and Gomorrah by Joachim Patinir, c. 1520

The etymology of the names Sodom and Gomorrah is uncertain, and scholars disagree about their origins. According to Burton MacDonald, the Hebrew term for Gomorrah was based on the Semitic root ʿ-m-r, which means "be deep, copious (water)".

They are known in Hebrew as סְדֹם (Səḏôm) and עֲמֹרָה (ʿĂmôrā). In the Septuagint, these became Σόδομα (Sódoma) and Γόμορρᾰ (Gómorrha); Biblical Hebrew ghayn merged with ayin after the Septuagint was transcribed.

== Biblical narrative ==
=== Lot and Chedorlaomer ===
Sodom and Gomorrah are among the "cities of the plain" referred to when Abraham and Lot resolve their conflict over land: Lot, the nephew of the Hebrew patriarch Abraham, chose to settle in the Jordan Valley and "moved his tent as far as Sodom". The cities were distinct entities at this time: Genesis 14:2 states that Bera was king of Sodom and Birsha was king of Gomorrah.

The two cities rebel against Chedorlaomer of Elam, to whom they were subject. At the Battle of Siddim, Chedorlaomer defeats them and takes many captives, including Lot. Abraham gathers his men, rescues Lot, and frees the cities.

=== Destruction of the cities ===
Later, God resolves to inform Abraham of his plans for Sodom, because God's knowledge or choice of Abraham meant that Abraham would "keep the way of the Lord by doing righteousness and justice", while Sodom had acquired a reputation for wickedness. Abraham asks God "Will you indeed sweep away the righteous with the wicked?" Starting at 50 people, Abraham negotiates with God, securing God's agreement to spare Sodom if ten righteous people could be found.

God sends two angels or messengers to destroy Sodom. They arrive in the evening and propose to spend the night in the town square, but Lot persuades them to stay with him and welcomes them into his home. Late in the evening, all the men of the town surround the house and demand that Lot surrender the visitors, that they may "know" them. Lot offers the mob his virgin daughters to "do to them as you please", but they refuse and threaten to do worse to Lot. The angels strike the crowd blind.

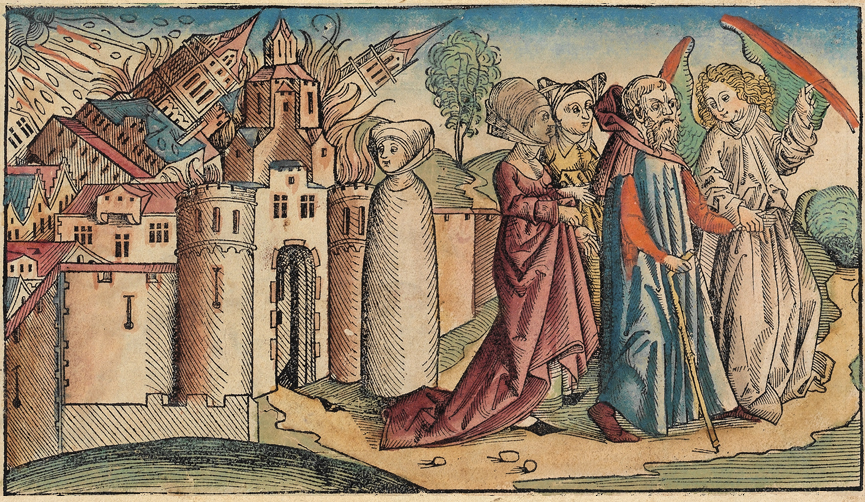
Lot and his daughters flee Sodom. Lot's wife (center) is already a pillar of salt. (Nuremberg Chronicle, 1493)

The messengers tell Lot, "For we are about to destroy this place; because the outcry against them before יהוה has become so great that יהוה has sent us to destroy it." (Genesis 19:13). The next morning, because Lot had lingered, the messengers took Lot, Lot's wife, and his two daughters by the hand and out of the city, and told him to flee to the hills and not look back. Lot says that the hills are too far away and asks to go to Zoara in the Transjordan instead, travelling there overnight (Genesis 19:23). God then rains sulfur (or brimstone) and fire on Sodom and Gomorrah and all the plain, all the inhabitants of the cities, and "what grew on the ground" (Genesis 19:24–25). Lot and his two daughters are saved, but his wife disregards the angels' warning, looks back, and is turned into a pillar of salt.

Sodom and Gomorrah feature in the story of Lot's daughters (Genesis 19:29).

== Other biblical references ==
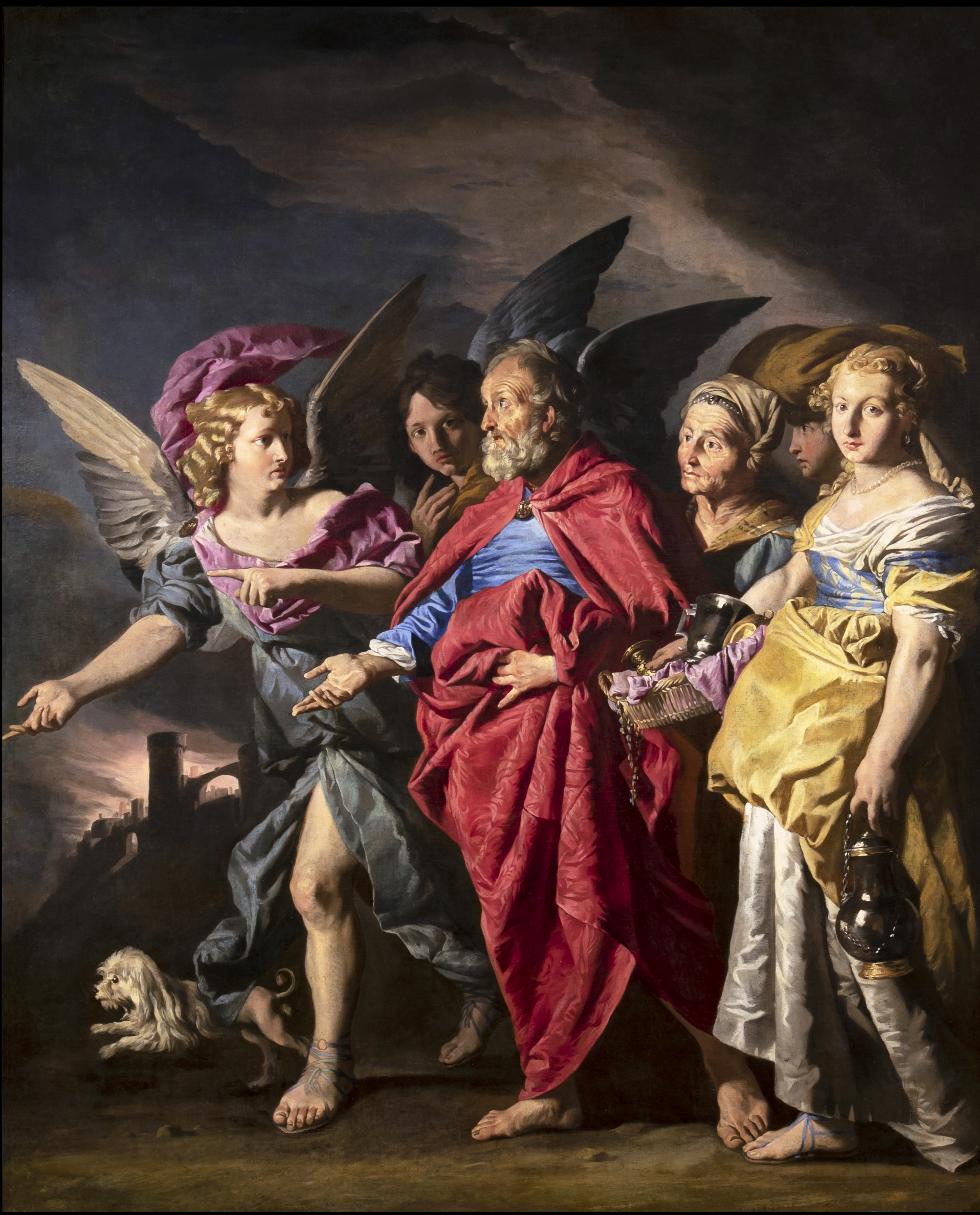
Sodom's destruction in the background of Matthias Stom's Flight from Sodom (1630)

The Hebrew Bible contains several other references to Sodom and Gomorrah. The New Testament also contains passages of parallels to the destruction and surrounding events that pertained to these cities and those who were involved. Later deuterocanonical texts attempt to glean additional insights about these cities of the Jordan Plain and their residents. Additionally, the sins which triggered the destruction are reminiscent of the Book of Judges' account of the Levite's concubine.

=== Hebrew Bible ===
"Sodom and Gomorrah" becomes a byword for destruction and desolation. Deuteronomy 29:21–23 refers to the destruction of Sodom and Gomorrah:

And the generation to come, your children that shall rise up after you, and the foreigner that shall come from a far land, shall say, when they see the plagues of that land, and the sicknesses wherewith the LORD hath made it sick; and that the whole land thereof is brimstone, and salt, and a burning, that it is not sown, nor beareth, nor any grass groweth therein, like the overthrow of Sodom and Gomorrah, Admah and Zeboiim, which the LORD overthrew in His anger, and in His wrath; even all the nations shall say 'Wherefore hath the LORD done thus unto this land? what meaneth the heat of this great anger?'

— Deuteronomy 29:21–23 (Note: See also: Deuteronomy 32:32–33)

Isaiah 1:9–10, 3:9 and 13:19–22 address people as from Sodom and Gomorrah, associates Sodom with shameless sinning and tells Babylon that it will end like those two cities.

Jeremiah 23:14, 49:17–18, 50:39–40 and Lamentations 4:6 associate Sodom and Gomorrah with adultery and lies, prophesy the fate of Edom (south of the Dead Sea), predict the fate of Babylon and use Sodom as a comparison.

Ezekiel 16:48–50 compares Jerusalem to Sodom, saying

As I live, saith the Lord GOD, Sodom thy sister hath not done, she nor her daughters, as thou hast done, thou and thy daughters. Behold, this was the iniquity of thy sister Sodom: pride, fulness of bread, and careless ease was in her and in her daughters; neither did she strengthen the hand of the poor and needy. And they were haughty, and committed abomination before Me; therefore I removed them when I saw it.

— Ezekiel 16:48–50

In Amos 4:1–11, God tells the Israelites that although he treated them like Sodom and Gomorrah, they still did not repent.

In Zephaniah 2:9, Zephaniah tells Moab and Ammon that they will end up like Sodom and Gomorrah.

=== Deuterocanon ===
Wisdom 10:6–8 refers to the Five Cities:

Wisdom rescued a righteous man when the ungodly were perishing; he escaped the fire that descended on the Five Cities. Evidence of their wickedness still remains: a continually smoking wasteland, plants bearing fruit that does not ripen, and a pillar of salt standing as a monument to an unbelieving soul. For because they passed wisdom by, they not only were hindered from recognizing the good, but also left for mankind a reminder of their folly, so that their failures could never go unnoticed.

— Wisdom 10:6–8

Wisdom 19:17 says that the Egyptians who enslaved the Israelites were "struck with blindness, like the men of Sodom who came to the door of that righteous man Lot. They found themselves in total darkness, as each one groped around to find his own door."

Sirach 16:8 says that "[God] did not spare the neighbors of Lot, whom he loathed on account of their insolence".

In 3 Maccabees 2:5, the high priest Simon says that God "consumed with fire and sulfur the men of Sodom who acted arrogantly, who were notorious for their vices; and you made them an example to those who should come afterward".

2 Esdras 2:8–9 says "Woe to you, Assyria, who conceal the unrighteous in your midst! O wicked nation, remember what I did to Sodom and Gomor'rah, whose land lies in lumps of pitch and heaps of ashes. So will I do to those who have not listened to me, says the Lord Almighty."

2 Esdras 5:1–13 describes signs of the end times, one of which is that "the sea of Sodom shall cast up fish".

In 2 Esdras 7:106, Ezra says that Abraham prayed for the people of Sodom.

Chapter 12 of 1 Meqabyan, a book considered canonical in the Ethiopian Orthodox Tewahedo Church, references "Gemorra an Sedom".

=== New Testament ===
In Matthew 10:14–15 (cf. Luke 10:11–12) Jesus says:

And whosoever shall not receive you, nor hear your words, when ye depart out of that house or city, shake off the dust from your feet. Verily I say unto you, It shall be more tolerable for the land of Sodom and Gomorrah in the day of judgement, than for that city.

— Matthew 10:14–15

In Matthew 11:20–24, Jesus warns of the fate of some cities where he did some of his works:

And you, Capernaum, will you be exalted to heaven? No, you will be brought down to Hades. For if the deeds of power done in you had been done in Sodom, it would have remained until this day. But I tell you that on the day of judgment it will be more tolerable for the land of Sodom than for you.

In Luke 17:28–30, Jesus says:

Likewise also as it was in the days of Lot; they did eat, they drank, they bought, they sold, they planted, they builded, but the same day that Lot went out of Sodom it rained fire and brimstone from heaven and destroyed them all. Even thus will it be in the day when the Son of man is revealed.

Romans 9:29 refers to the words of Isaiah 1:9: "And as Isaiah predicted, "If the Lord of hosts had not left survivors to us, we would have fared like Sodom and been made like Gomorrah."

2 Peter 2:4–10 says that just as God destroyed Sodom and Gomorrah and saved Lot, he will deliver godly people from temptations and punish the wicked on Judgement Day.

Jude 1:7 records that both Sodom and Gomorrah "indulged in sexual immorality and pursued unnatural lust, serve as an example by undergoing a punishment of eternal fire".

Revelation 11:7–8, regarding the two witnesses, reads:

When they have finished their testimony, the beast that comes up from the bottomless pit will make war on them and conquer them and kill them, and their dead bodies will lie in the street of the great city that is prophetically called Sodom and Egypt, where also their Lord was crucified.

This wording is rendered "Sodom or Egypt" in some translations.

== The sin of Sodom ==
In the Hebrew Bible, God destroyed Sodom for its sins, but in the Genesis story, no sin is singled out as the cause of this destruction. Other texts, including apocrypha such as the Book of Jubilees, attributed a variety of sins, both sexual and nonsexual, to the inhabitants of Sodom. Over time, "unnatural" sex began to be more predominantly included among these, and eventually homosexuality was interpreted as the primary sin of Sodom. Since 1955, scholars increasingly view the great sin of Sodom to be one of inhospitable treatment of guests. Much of the debate in modern interpretation of the greatest sin of Sodom, and relatedly, whether the story concerns or condemns homosexuality, rests upon interpreting the moment the mob from Sodom confronts Lot about his guests. The idea that the sins of Sodom were sexual in nature seems to be an innovation (deviation) of Philo of Alexandria. The homophobic Christian interpretation began in the 6th century AD, becoming fully accepted Church dogma in the 12th century AD.

For the prophets Ezekiel, Isaiah, and Jeremiah, the crimes of Sodom are not primarily sexual in nature, but concern the poor treatment of the less fortunate.

=== Origin of the term sodomy ===
Sodom and Gomorrah, or the "cities of the plain", have been used historically and in modern discourse as metaphors for homosexuality, and are the origin of the English words sodomite, a pejorative term for male homosexuals; "sod", a British vulgar slang term for male homosexuals; and sodomy, which is used in a legal context under the label crimes against nature to describe anal or oral sex (particularly homosexual) and bestiality.

This is based upon Christian exegesis of the biblical text interpreting divine judgment upon Sodom and Gomorrah as punishment for the sin of homosexual sex. Byrne Fone, in Homophobia: A History, analyzes the history of theological discourse surrounding Sodom and Gomorrah. He locates the origin of the argument that sodomy was sinful to a contested reading of one word in the story. Citing Sodom and Gomorrah, Christian authorities began to label and condemn acts of sodomy as the worst of all sexual sins, and one of the worst crimes in general. For many centuries, the story of Sodom and Gomorrah was used by the church to justify criminalization of sexual practices between men, and people labeled sodomites were often punished by execution. Western nations followed with similar criminalization of male homosexuality and sexual practices between men, and thousands of people were executed since 1292 under these laws.

Later, the term sodomite became an insult used against enemies of the church, regardless of sexuality or perceived sexual activity. The term began to be used on the basis of geography, ethnicity, and religion. Sodomy trials were also used by authorities against opponents, because some laws allowed the seizure of property and assets once someone was convicted of sodomy. Sodomy began to be decriminalized in Europe during the Age of Enlightenment: this process began when writers like Voltaire and the Marquis de Sade argued for tolerance of sodomy and dropping the death penalty. By the 1900s, the term sodomy began to leave legal discourse, and with the popularity of new terms like homosexual and heterosexual, people started to debate or condemn same-gender sexuality using the new terms instead.

=== Hospitality interpretation ===
A number of contemporary scholars dispute the interpretation that the sins of Sodom and Gomorrah concern homosexuality. Scholars cite Ezekiel 16:49–50, quoted above, and interpret the sin as arrogance and lack of hospitality. As with Ezekiel, later prophetic reproaches of Sodom and Gomorrah do not condemn, implicate, or even mention homosexual conduct as the reason for the cities' destruction: instead assigning the blame to other sins, such as adultery, dishonesty, and uncharitableness.

Some Islamic societies incorporate punishments associated with Sodom and Gomorrah into sharia.

== Historicity ==
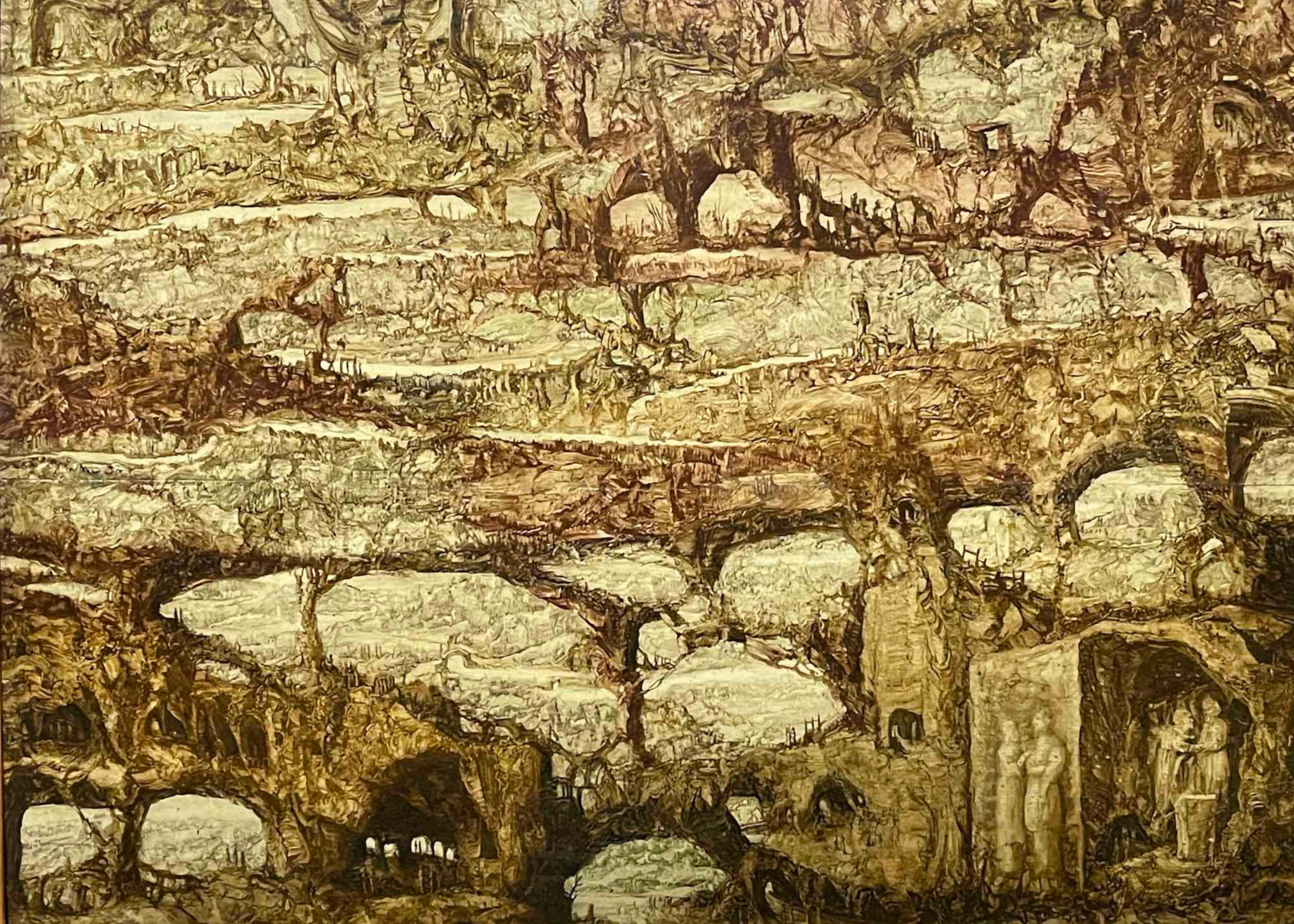
The Destruction of Sodom and Gomorrah by Mathieu Dubus, 1630/65

In the event the story has a historical basis, some naturalistic explanations have been proposed to explain the devastation of the cities as described in the Bible including a natural disaster. The Dead Sea area could have been devastated by an earthquake between 2100 and 1900 BC which then might have unleashed showers of steaming tar. This is possible in view of the fact that the location of the towns as described in the Bible would have been along a major fault such as the Jordan Rift Valley. There are, however, no known contemporary accounts of seismic activity that corroborate this theory. This and the suggestion that they were destroyed by a volcano have been deemed unlikely. The hypothesis that the disaster was a meteor airburst, such as the Tunguska incident, has also been dismissed. Some also argue that the story is a blend of actual locations and events rather than a singular historical incident.

=== Possible sites ===
Archibald Sayce translated an Akkadian poem describing cities that were destroyed in a rain of fire and written from the view of a person who escaped the destruction; unfortunately, the names of the cities are not given in the work. Sayce later mentions that the story more closely resembles the doom of Sennacherib's host.

The ancient Greek historiographer Strabo states that locals living near Moasada (as opposed to Masada) say that "there were once thirteen inhabited cities in that region of which Sodom was the metropolis". Strabo identifies a limestone and salt hill at the southwestern tip of the Dead Sea, and Mount Sodom (Hebrew: הר סדום, Har Sedom or Arabic: جبل السدوم, Jabal as-Sudūm) ruins nearby as the site of biblical Sodom.

The Jewish historian Josephus identifies the Dead Sea in geographic proximity to the ancient biblical city of Sodom. He refers to the lake by its Greek name, Asphaltites. Some scholars believe that the locations of the two cities are currently flooded beneath the southern basin of the Dead Sea.

In 1973, Walter E. Rast and R. Thomas Schaub discovered or visited a number of possible sites of the cities, including Bab edh-Dhra, which was originally excavated in 1965 by archaeologist Paul Lapp, and later finished by Rast and Schaub following Lapp's death. Other possibilities include Numeira, al-Safi, Feifa (or Fifa, Feifah), and Khirbet al-Khanazir, which were also visited by Schaub and Rast. According to Schaub, Numeira was destroyed in 2600 BC at a different time period than Bab edh-Dhra (2350–2067 BC). However, Kris J. Udd proposed that the date of destruction of Numeira and that of Bab edh-Dhra could be lowered to 2100–2050 BC and 2000–1950 BC respectively.

In 1993, Nancy Lapp, from the Pittsburgh Theological Seminary, reported that Feifa had no Bronze Age occupation and was merely an Early Bronze Age cemetery with Iron Age walls. She reports:

In the final season of the present series of excavations of the Expedition to the Dead Sea Plain (1990–1991), the walled site of Feifa was investigated and the EB [Early Bronze Age] cemetery that stretched to its east was excavated. The most recent surveys suggested that the visible structures of the walled site belonged to the Iron Age or Roman period.

At Khirbet al-Khanazir, the walls which Rast and Schaub had identified in 1973 as houses were in reality rectangular charnel houses marking shaft tombs from near the end of the Early Bronze Age and not occupational structures.

In 1976, Giovanni Pettinato claimed that a cuneiform tablet that had been found in the newly discovered library at Ebla contained the names of all five of the cities of the plain (Sodom, Gomorrah, Admah, Zeboim, and Bela), listed in the same order as in Genesis. The names si-da-mu [TM.76.G.524] and ì-ma-ar [TM.75.G.1570 and TM.75.G.2233] were identified as representing Sodom and Gomorrah, which gained some acceptance at the time. However, Alfonso Archi states that, judging from the surrounding city names in the cuneiform list, si-da-mu lies in northern Syria and not near the Dead Sea, and ì-ma-ar is a variant of ì-mar, known to represent Emar, an ancient city located near Ebla. Today, the scholarly consensus is that "Ebla has no bearing on ... Sodom and Gomorra."

== Biblical scholarship ==
Robert Gnuse compares the narrative to ancient Greek tales of theoxenia, and notes in Mesopotamian literature the theme of divine beings in disguise as humans is largely absent. In such stories a key element is assessment of human hospitality by the gods in order to evaluate the morality of the host, encounters with these disguised celestial visitors can result in a pass or fail for the test. Bible commenters have also pointed to similarities between the Lot and angels narrative in Genesis 19 with the story of the traveling Levite and his concubine in Judges 19.

Scott Morschauser argues that the intent of the mob in the city was not to act in sexual violence, but to interrogate the strangers. However, he acknowledges there is undoubtably a clear play with the Hebrew word meaning to "know" in the verses. Michael Carden instead says the issue at hand was that of a lack of consent and use of intimidation by the men of Sodom, not homosexuality, and the euphemism used indicates rape. In the ancient world, this aggressive action would signal an attempt to assert superiority over the passive recipients. It is the theme of not treating strangers well that is the narrative's central focus, rather than sexual orientation.

Victor P. Hamilton in his commentary says Lot offering up his daughters would be interpreted by ancient readers as a righteous act, while others believe it is meant to depict him negatively. Accordingly, when Lot is later assaulted by his own daughters it is seen as a deserved narrative reversal, with the perpetrator and victims exchanging roles. It has also been argued that Lot's offer to the crowd was a bluff, as an excursus in Genesis 19:14 indicates that his daughters are already married to his sons-in-law, denoting they may have not been virgins.

== Religious views ==
=== Judaism ===
Later Hebrew prophets named the sins of Sodom and Gomorrah as adultery, pridefulness, and uncharitableness.

Rictor Norton views classical Jewish texts as stressing the cruelty and lack of hospitality of the inhabitants of Sodom to the "stranger". Rabbinic writings affirm that the Sodomites also committed economic crimes, blasphemy, and bloodshed. Other extrabiblical crimes committed by Sodom and Gomorrah included extortion on crossing a river, harshly punishing victims for crimes that the perpetrator committed, forcing an assault victim to pay for the perpetrator's "bloodletting" and forcing a woman to marry a man who intentionally caused her miscarriage to compensate for the lost child. Because of this, the judges of the two cities were referred to as Shakrai ("Liar"), Shakurai ("Awful Liar"), Zayyafi ("Forger") and Mazle Dina ("Perverter of Justice"). Eliezer was reported to be a victim of such legally unjust conduct, after Sarah sent him to Sodom to report on Lot's welfare. The citizens also regularly tortured foreigners who sought lodging. They did this by providing the foreigners a standard-sized bed and if they saw that the foreigners were too short for the beds, they would forcibly stretch their limbs, but if the foreigners were too tall, they would cut off their legs (the Greek myth of Procrustes tells a similar story). As a result, many people refrained from visiting Sodom and Gomorrah. Beggars who settled into the two cities for refuge were similarly mistreated. The citizens would give them marked coins (presumably used to purchase food) but were nonetheless forbidden, by proclamation, to provide these necessary services. Once the beggar died of starvation, citizens who initially gave the beggar the coins were permitted to retrieve them, provided that they could recognize it. The beggar's clothing was also provided as a reward for any citizen who could successfully overcome his opponent in a street fight.

The provision of bread and water to the poor was also a capital offense (Yalḳ., Gen. 83). Two girls, one poor and the other rich, went to a well, and the former gave the latter her jug of water, receiving in return a vessel containing bread. When this became known, both were burned alive. According to the Book of Jasher, Paltith, one of Lot's daughters, was burnt alive (in some versions, on a pyre) for giving a poor man bread. Her cries went to the heavens. Another woman was similarly executed in Admah for giving a traveler, who intended to leave the town the next day, water. When the scandal was revealed, the woman was stripped naked and covered with honey. This attracted bees as the woman was slowly stung to death (see Scaphism). Her cries then went up into the heavens, the turning point that was revealed to have provoked God to enact judgement upon Sodom and Gomorrah in the first place in Genesis 18:20. Lot's wife (who came from Sodom) had disapproved of her husband welcoming the strangers into their home; her asking for salt from neighbors had alerted the mob which came to Lot's door. As punishment, she was turned into a pillar of salt.

Jon D. Levenson views a rabbinic tradition described in the Mishnah as postulating that the sin of Sodom was a violation of conventional hospitality in addition to homosexual conduct, describing Sodom's lack of generosity with the saying, "What is mine is mine; what is yours is yours" (m. Avot 5.10).

Jay Michaelson proposes a reading of the story of Sodom that emphasizes the violation of hospitality as well as the violence of the Sodomites. "Homosexual rape is the way in which they violate hospitality—not the essence of their transgression. Reading the story of Sodom as being about homosexuality is like reading the story of an ax murderer as being about an ax." Michaelson places the story of Sodom in context with other Genesis stories regarding Abraham's hospitality to strangers, and argues that when other texts in the Hebrew Bible mention Sodom, they do so without commentary on homosexuality. The verses cited by Michaelson include Jeremiah 23:14, where the sins of Jerusalem are compared to Sodom and are listed as adultery, lying, and strengthening the hands of evildoers; Amos 4:1–11, as oppressing the poor and crushing the needy; and Ezekiel 16:49–50, which defines the sins of Sodom as "pride, fullness of bread, and abundance of idleness was in her and in her daughters, neither did she strengthen the hand of the poor and needy. And they were haughty, and did toevah before me, and I took them away as I saw fit." Michaelson uses toevah in place of abomination to emphasize the original Hebrew, which he explains as being more correctly translated as "taboo".

Rabbi Basil Herring, who served as head of the Rabbinical Council of America from 2003 to 2012, writes that both the rabbinic literature and modern Orthodox position consider the Torah to condemn homosexuality as an abomination. Moreover, that it "conveys its abhorrence of homosexuality through a variety of narrative settings", God's judgment of Sodom and Gomorrah being a "paradigmatic" instance of such condemnation.

=== Christianity ===
Two areas of contention have arisen in modern Christian scholarship concerning the story of Sodom and Gomorrah:

- Whether or not the violent mob surrounding Lot's house were demanding to engage in sexual violence against Lot's guests.
- Whether it was homosexuality or another transgression, such as the act of inhospitable behavior towards visitors, the act of sexual assault, murder, theft, adultery, idolatry, power abuses, or prideful and mocking behavior, that was the principal reason for God's destruction of Sodom and Gomorrah.

The first contention focuses primarily upon the meaning of the Hebrew verb Hebrew: ידע (yada), translated as know in the King James Version:

And they called unto Lot, and said unto him, Where are the men which came in to thee this night? Bring them out unto us, that we may know them.

— Genesis 19:5

Yada is used to refer to sexual intercourse in various instances, such as in Genesis 4:1 between Adam and Eve:

And Adam knew Eve his wife; and she conceived, and bare Cain, and said, I have gotten a man from the Lord.

— Genesis 4:1

Some Hebrew scholars believe that yada, unlike the English word "know", requires the existence of a "personal and intimate relationship". For this reason, many of the most popular of the 20th-century translations, including the New International Version, the New King James Version, and the New Living Translation, translate yada as "have sex with" or "know ... carnally" in Genesis 19:5.

Those who favor the nonsexual interpretation argue against a denotation of sexual behavior in this context, noting that while the Hebrew word for "know" appears over 900 times in the Hebrew Bible, only 1% (13–14 times) of those references are clearly used as a euphemism for realizing sexual intimacy. Instead, those who hold to this interpretation see the demand to know as demanding the right to interrogate the strangers.

Countering this is the observation that one of the examples of "know" meaning to know sexually occurs when Lot responds to the Genesis 19:5 request, by offering his daughters for rape, only three verses later in the same narrative:

Behold now, I have two daughters which have not known man; let me, I pray you, bring them out unto you, and do ye to them as is good in your eyes: only unto these men do nothing; for therefore came they under the shadow of my roof.

— Genesis 19:8

The Epistle of Jude is a major text in regard to these conflicting opinions:

Even as Sodom and Gomorrha, and the cities about them in like manner, giving themselves over to fornication, and going after strange flesh, are set forth for an example, suffering the vengeance of eternal fire.

— Jude 1:7

Many who interpret the stories in a nonsexual context contend that as the word for "strange" is akin to "another", "other", "altered" or even "next", the meaning is unclear, and if the condemnation of Sodom was the result of sexual activities perceived to be perverse, then it is likely that it was because women sought to commit fornication with "other than human" angels, perhaps referring to Genesis 6:1–4 or the apocryphal Book of Enoch. Countering this, it is pointed out that Genesis 6 refers to angels seeking women, not men seeking angels, and that both Sodom and Gomorrah were engaged in the sin Jude describes before the angelic visitation, and that, regardless, it is doubtful that the Sodomites knew they were angels. In addition, it is argued the word used in the King James Version of the Bible for "strange" can mean unlawful or corrupted (e.g. in Romans 7:3, Galatians 1:6), and that the apocryphal Second Book of Enoch condemns "sodomitic" sex (2 Enoch 10:3; 34:1), thus indicating that homosexual relations was the prevalent physical sin of Sodom.

Both the nonsexual and the homosexuality view invoke certain classical writings as well as other portions of the Bible.

Now this was the sin of Sodom: She and her daughters were arrogant, overfed and unconcerned; they did not help the poor and needy. They were haughty and did detestable things before me. Therefore I did away with them as you have seen.

— Ezekiel 16:49–50

Here, the nonsexual view focuses on the inhospitality aspect, while the other notes the description detestable or abomination, the Hebrew word for which often denotes moral sins, including those of a sexual nature.

The nonsexual view focuses on the cultural importance of hospitality, which this biblical story shares with other ancient civilizations, such as Ancient Greece and Ancient Rome, where hospitality was of singular importance and strangers were under the protection of the gods. James L. Kugel, Starr Professor of Hebrew Literature at Harvard University, suggests the story encompasses the sexual and nonsexual: the Sodomites were guilty of stinginess, inhospitality and sexual license, homo- and heterosexual in contrast to the generosity of Abraham, and Lot whose behavior in protecting the visitors but offering his daughters suggests he was "scarcely better than his neighbors" according to some ancient commentators, The Bible As It Was, 1997, pp. 179–197.

Within the Christian churches that agree on the possible sexual interpretation of "know" (yada) in this context, there is still a difference of opinion on whether homosexuality is important. On its website, the Anglican Communion presents the argument that the story is "not even vaguely about homosexual love or relationships", but is instead "about dominance and rape, by definition an act of violence, not of sex or love". This argument that the violence and the threat of violence towards foreign visitors is the true ethical downfall of Sodom (and not homosexuality), also observes the similarity between the Sodom and Gomorrah and the Battle of Gibeah Bible stories. In both stories, an inhospitable mob demands the homosexual rape of a foreigner or foreigners. As the mob instead settles for the rape and murder of the foreigner's female concubine in the Battle of Gibeah story, the homosexual aspect is generally seen as inconsequential, and the ethical downfall is understood to be the violence and the threat of violence towards foreigners by the mob. This Exodus 22:21–24 lesson is viewed by Anglicans as a more historically accurate way to interpret the Sodom and Gomorrah story.

Lisa McClain of Boise State University has argued that the association between Sodom and Gomorrah with homosexuality emerged from the writings of 1st century philosopher Philo some 1,500 years after story was first recorded, and that no prior exegesis of the text suggested such a linkage.

=== Islam ===
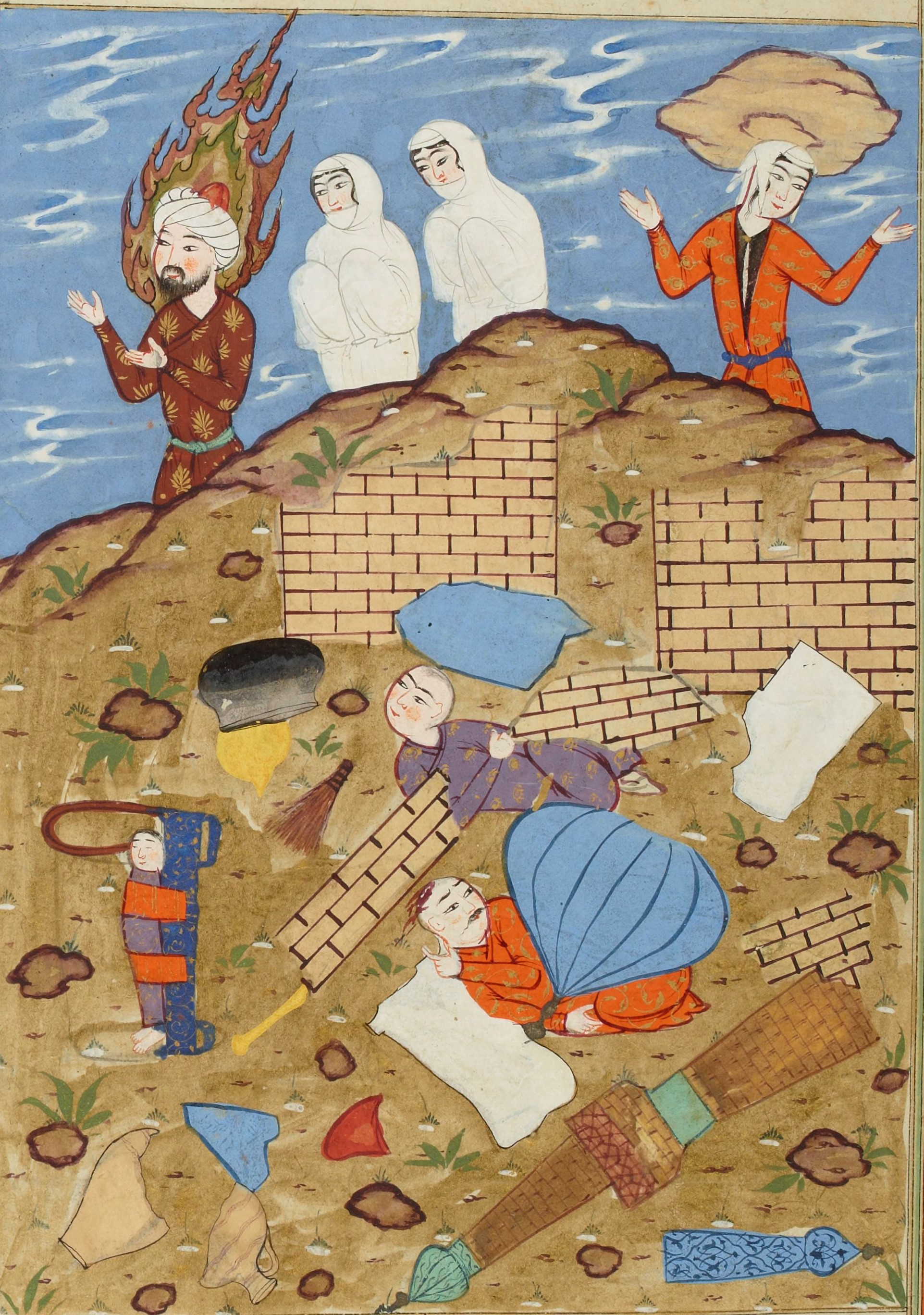
Lut fleeing the city with his daughters; his wife is killed by a rock.

The Quran contains twelve references to "the people of Lut", the biblical Lot, the residents of Sodom and Gomorrah presumably, and their destruction by God which is associated primarily with their idolatrous practices.

The "people of Lut" transgressed consciously against the bounds of God. Lot only prayed to God to be saved from doing as they did. Then Gabriel met Lot and said that he must leave the city quickly, as God had given this command to Lot to save his life. In the Quran, it was written that Lot's wife stayed behind, as she had transgressed. She met her fate in the disaster, and only Lot and his family were saved during the destruction of their city, with the understanding that the cities of Sodom and Gomorrah are identified in Genesis, but "the location remains unnamed in the Qur'an".

The Quran, chapter 15 (The Stoneland) –

So the (mighty) Blast overtook them before morning, And We turned the cities ˹of Sodom and Gomorrah˺ upside down and rained upon them stones of baked clay. Surely in this are signs for those who contemplate. Their ruins still lie along a known route.

— Quran 15:73-76

In the Quran, chapter 26 (The Poets) –

So, We saved him and his family, all. Except an old woman among those who remained behind.

— Quran 26:170

Commentary: This was his wife, who was a bad old woman. She stayed behind and was destroyed with whoever else was left. This is similar to what Allah says about them in Surat Al-A`raf and Surat Hud, and in Surat Al-Hijr, where Allah commanded him to take his family at night, except for his wife, and not to turn around when they heard the Sayhah as it came upon his people. So they patiently obeyed the command of Allah and persevered, and Allah sent upon the people a punishment which struck them all, and rained upon them stones of baked clay, piled up.

— Tafsir ibn Kathir (Commentary by Ibn Kathir)

=== Gnosticism ===
A different conception of the cities is found in the Paraphrase of Shem, a Gnostic text from the literature of the Nag Hammadi library. In this narrative, the figure Shem, who is guided by a spiritual savior named Derdekeas, brings his universal teaching of secret knowledge (Gnosis) to the citizens of Sodom before the city is unjustly destroyed by the base nature of the "demon of human form" and his archons. Another is the Apocalypse of Adam, where there is a "cosmic conflagration" involving fire, sulphur, and asphalt against a city built by Sethians. This is associated by scholars with the destruction of Sodom and Gomorrah. Instead of sin, they possessed forbidden spiritual light that threatened the Demiurge’s control.

== See also ==
Cities of the plain

- Admah
- Zeboim (Hebrew Bible)
- Zoara
- Battle of Siddim from the vale of Siddim ("the plain")

Related topics

- Bab edh-Dhra and Numeira, two adjacent archeological sites said by some to be the two cities' locations
- Christianity and homosexuality
- Christianity and sexual orientation
- Hospitium
- Homosexuality and Judaism
- Homosexuality and religion
- Homosexuality in the Hebrew Bible
- Levite's concubine – a similar biblical narrative
- LGBTQ people and Islam
- Religion and LGBTQ people
- The Bible and homosexuality
- Tripura, cities likewise destroyed by divine intervention as described in Hindu mythology
- Vayeira, the Torah portion concerning Sodom and Gomorrah
- Xenia
