= American Center of Research =

US research center in Jordan

- Formation: 1968
- Type: Research center
- Headquarters: Alexandria, Virginia, U.S., and Amman, Jordan
- Director: Pearce Paul Creasman, Ph.D.
- President: Edward W. Gnehm, Jr.
- Website: acorjordan.org

The American Center of Research (ACOR) is a private, not-for-profit scholarly and educational organization. Based in Alexandria, Virginia, with a facility in Amman, Jordan, ACOR promotes knowledge of Jordan and the interconnected region, past and present. Prior to 2020, ACOR was known as The American Center of Oriental Research. The center is wholly independent of any other entity, with its own board of trustees, funding, fellowships, and other resources.

== History ==
As the region changed during the mid-20th century, the foundation of a permanent and sustainable independent research center for Americans working or studying in the Arab World was needed, and in 1968 ACOR was created as "The American Research Center in Amman." The center was intended to serve as a consortium in support of North American projects working in the Middle East, specifically including Jordan, Syria, Lebanon, Iraq, Saudi Arabia, Yemen, and territories of the Arabian Gulf. It works in or with the people of these countries today, primarily at and from its center in Amman.

It was first directed by Rudolph H. Dornemann, followed by Murray B. Nicol. It became "The American Center of Oriental Research in Amman" in 1970. One of ACOR's first projects was excavating a Byzantine church in Swafiyeh, Amman, by the director and annual professor Bastiaan Van Elderen in partnership with Jordan's Department of Antiquities, also serving as a training course for students attending the University of Jordan. From June 7–13, 1970, Van Elderen and various residents barricaded themselves in the ACOR residence during fighting between the Palestine Liberation Organization (PLO) and the Jordanian army. Murray Nicol was appointed new director in 1970 but was prevented from serving by the second phase of the war in Jordan, so Siegfried H. Horn replaced him at the urging of the U.S. Embassy in Amman, followed by Henry O. Thompson. In 1975 George Mendenhall was director, followed by James A. Sauer from 1976-1981. During the late 1970's and early 1980's ACOR conducted and sponsored projects in Syria, Iraq, and Saudi Arabia, in addition to those in Jordan.

In 1976 the building was remodeled, adding hostel accommodation for eight people and a 1,800-book library. In 1980, ACOR began partnership with the United States Agency for International Development (USAID) and was awarded a contract to write a five-year plan for archaeological development. In 1982 David McCreery became director, and ACOR began to grant fellowships. ACOR moved to a purpose-built building in 1986, with partial funding from USAID's office of American Schools and Hospitals Abroad and a ribbon-cutting ceremony by H.R.H. Prince Mohammed Bin Talal. In 1988 Bert de Vries took over as director, succeeded by Pierre Bikai in 1991, who oversaw an expansion to the Amman center in 2004. Barbara A. Porter became director in 2006, and Pearce Paul Creasman in 2020. The Amman center underwent a comprehensive renovation from 2021-2023, converting the hostel to a residence, expanding the library’s capacity, and modernizing all systems. Several long-term staff included cook Mohammed Adawi, born around in the Palestinian village of Zakariyya, who served as such for the duration of ACOR's existence and Librarian Carmen (Humi) Ayoubi, who managed the library from 1988 to 2020.

ACOR has a strict policy of non-involvement in modern politics.

== Notable ACOR Excavations ==
ACOR has led or sponsored many affiliated archaeological and restoration projects in the region, most notably in Jordan: 'Ain Ghazal, Amman Citadel's Temple of Hercules, Ayla in Aqaba, Bab edh-Dhra, Hesban, Humeima, Khirbet Iskander, Madaba Archaeological Park Project, Pella, Petra Church Project, Petra Temple of the Winged Lions Cultural Resource Management, and Umm el-Jimal.

== Digital archive ==
In 2016, ACOR began a four-year project to digitize and preserve photographs of Jordan and surrounding areas. Photographs from six different private collections are part of the project donated by George Bass, Linda Jacobs, Rami Khouri, Robert Schick, Jane Taylor, and Charles Wilson. The project won four additional years of support in 2020 and is now focused on a wider variety of content. This project is available online at https://acor.digitalrelab.com/.

== Fellowships ==
ACOR presents 20-30 fellowships annually at present, to students from Jordan, the United States, and other countries. They include: the NEH Fellowship, the ACOR-CAORC Post Graduate Fellowship, the ACOR-CAORC Pre-Doctorate Fellowship, the Jennifer C. Groot Memorial Fellowship, the Bert and Sally de Vries Fellowship, the Harrell Family Fellowship, the Pierre and Patricia Bikai Fellowship, the Burton MacDonald and Rosemarie Sampson Fellowship, the Kenneth W. Russell Fellowship, the James A. Sauer Fellowship, the Frederick-Wenger Memorial Endowment, the Jordanian Graduate Student Scholarship and the Jordanian Travel Scholarship for ASOR Annual Meeting. Scholars can also apply to the CAORC Multi-Country Fellowship Program and the Andrew. W. Mellon Mediterranean Regional Research Fellowship Program.
