= Numeira =

Archaeological site in Jordan

Coordinates: 31.131588°N 35.529399°E

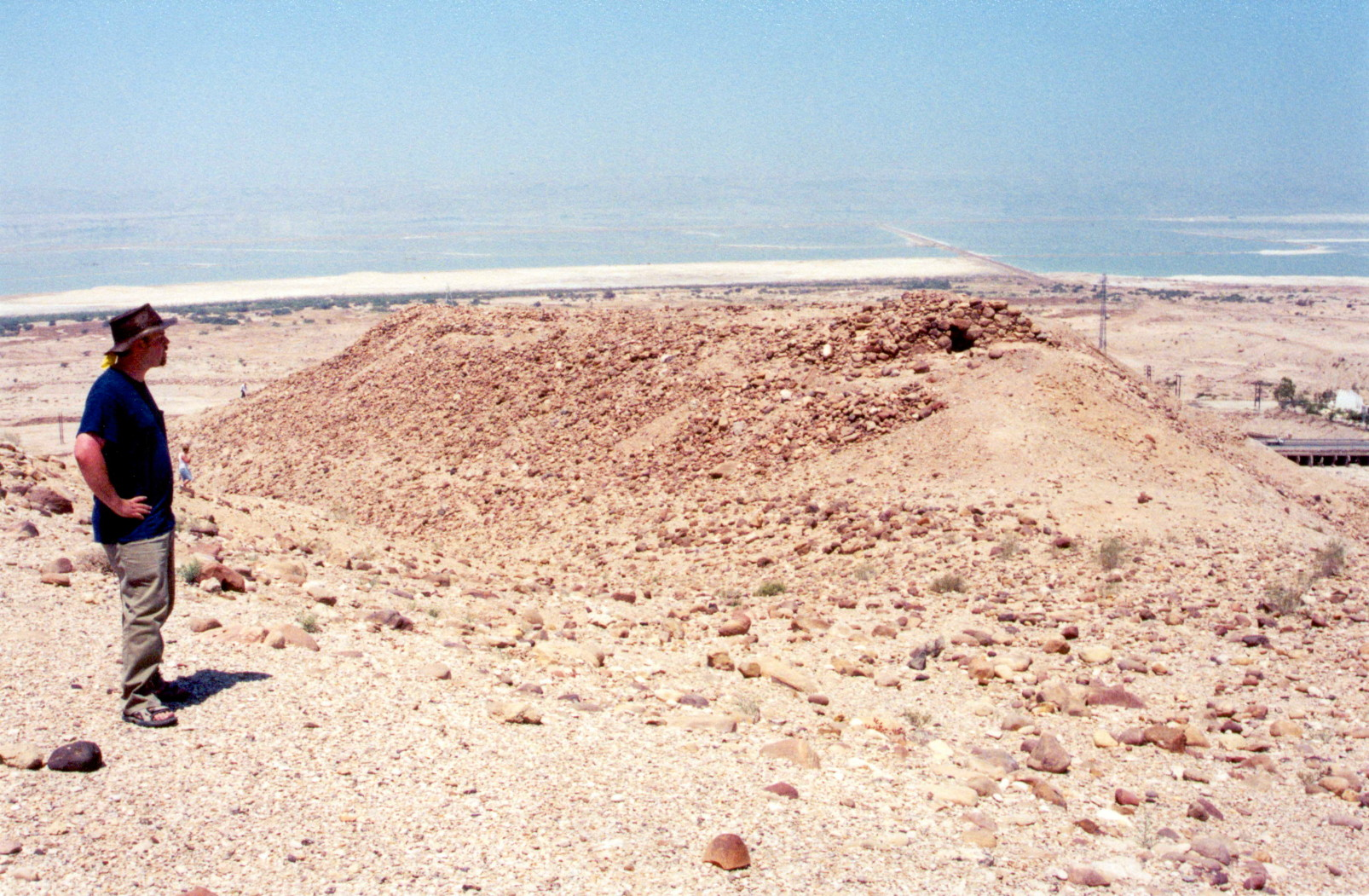
Overview of Numeira, looking west

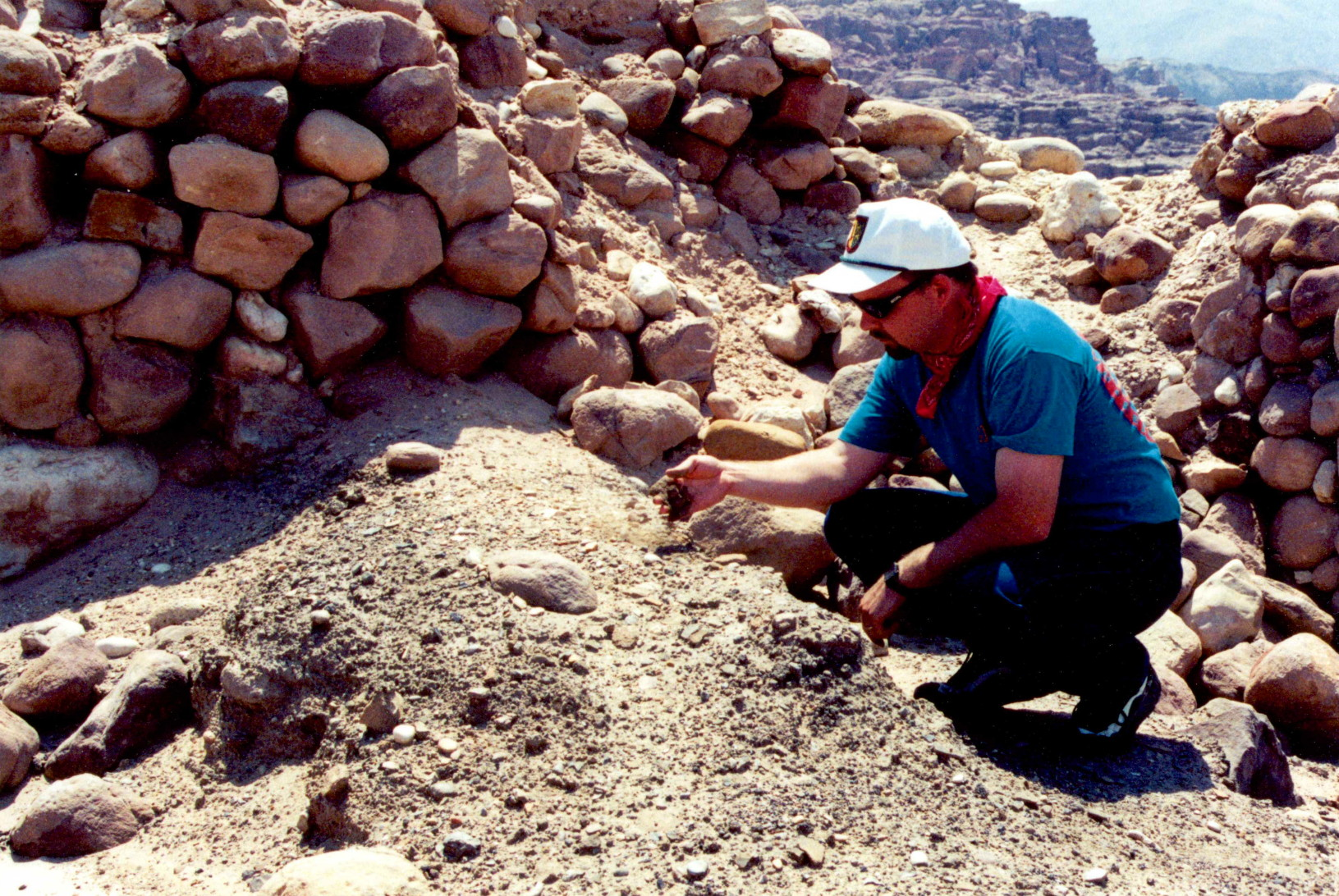
Early Bronze III destruction level at Numeira, inside the east gate

Numeira (also an-Numayra) is an archaeological site in Jordan near the southern Dead Sea. The site has substantial Early Bronze Age remains.

The site is 280 metres (920 ft) below sea level, on the shore of the Dead Sea.

Numeira is also the name given to the river and valley (wadi) adjacent to the archaeological site. The river is significantly eroding the archaeological site, destroying perhaps as much as half the original settlement due to changes in the water course.

== Identification ==
It has been argued that Numeira approximates the alleged biblical city of Gomorrah, although other archaeologists argue that it is in the wrong geographical area, was a village as opposed to a major city, and is not within the designated timeframe. Another possibility is that it could be Nimrim, the river valley referred to by the prophet Isaiah in 15:6 whose waters become desolate, or dry up.

== History ==
=== Early Bronze Age ===
==== Early Bronze III ====
Numeira was occupied during the EB III. There are several indications that it was a colony of Bab edh-Dhra including a lack of tombs in the vicinity of Numeira, and ceramic evidence the inhabitants buried their dead outside Bab edh-Dhra. If not a direct colony the pottery remains indicate the two towns certainly traded with each other.

Calibrated radiocarbon dates place the settlement in the EB III. Habitation spanning approximately 250 years or 10-12 generations. Numeira was violently destroyed at the end of the EB III, (2300 BC.) never to be re-occupied. This is 200 years earlier than the current assumed date for the destruction of Sodom, however, it is also proposed that the date of destruction of Numeira could be shifted to 2100–2050 BC.

Excavations indicate Numeira was a 0.5-hectare (1.2-acre) walled settlement, though it may have been twice the size we see today. Though only 30% of the site was excavated (c. 1500 m^{2}) between 1979 and 1983. The settlement was located on the southern bank of the Wadi Numeira.

Phase 1a Phase 1a saw the construction of several banks of lined pits around unused square areas. It is conjectured that this represented storage pits around a family tent.

Phase 1b In stage 1b saw the addition of more pits and walls, hearths, and evidence of a more sedentary lifestyle.

Phase 2 Phase 2 saw construction of fortification walls and residential and non-residential stone and mudbrick architecture. A non domestic area was located at the western gate. The Phase 2 occupation saw the addition of more walls and storage pits. The final stage of occupation seems to have been a much smaller town which ended when the town was burned. and one of the fortification towers collapsed. An interesting note is that many of the doors in the town at this time appear to have been blocked up.

== See also ==
- Bab edh-Dhra — a candidate site for "Sodom"
