= Zeboim (Hebrew Bible) =

One of a cluster of five biblical cities

Zeboim is the name in English of two or three places in the Hebrew Bible:

- Zeboim, Zeboiim or Tzvoyim (Note: Hebrew: צְבוֹיִים, Modern: Ṣəvōyīm, Tiberian: Ṣeḇōyīm, "Deer (plural); goats; gazelles; roes") was one of the "five cities of the plain" of Sodom, generally coupled with Admah. The territory of the Canaanites after the time of Noah was said to extend "from Sidon in the direction of Gerar as far as Gaza, and in the direction of Sodom, Gomorrah, Admah, and Zeboiim, as far as Lasha. Zeboim is also mentioned in Genesis 14:2, Deuteronomy 29:23, and Hosea 11:8. It had a king of its own ("Shemeber", שמאבר), and was therefore a place of some importance. Shemeber was one of the city kings who rebelled against Chedorlaomer in Genesis 14. The city was destroyed along with the other cities of the plain, according to Deuteronomy 29:23.
- The Valley of Zeboyim (גי הצבעים Gē haṣṢāḇoʻim, "Valley of the Hyenas"), a valley or rugged glen somewhere near Gibeah in Benjamin (1 Samuel 13:18). It was probably the place now bearing the name Wadi Shaykh aḍ-Ḍubʻa, "Ravine of the Chief of the Hyenas", north of Jericho.
- Zeboim (צבעים Ṣāḇoʻim, "Hyenas"), a place mentioned only in the Book of Nehemiah 11:34, inhabited by the Benjamites after the Babylonian captivity.

== See also ==
- Admah – one of the five "cities of the plain"
- Sodom and Gomorrah – two of the five "cities of the plain"
- Zoar, former Bela – the last of the five "cities of the plain"
