= Bab edh-Dhra =

Early Bronze Age city

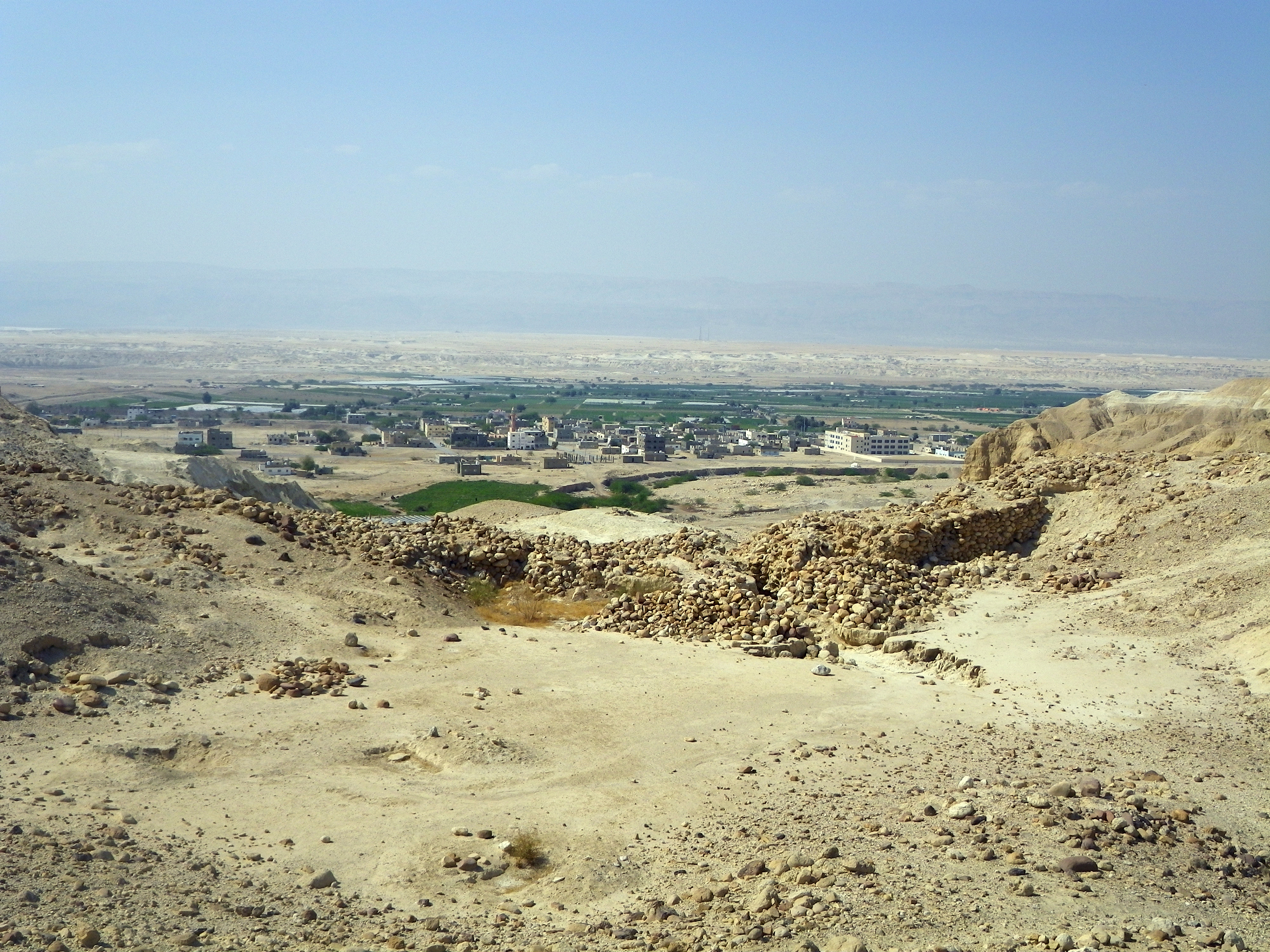
- The early Bronze Age gate of Bab edh-Dhra overlooking the southern end of the Dead Sea

- Location within Jordan
- 31.253092°N 35.537514°E
- Type: Settlement
- Cultures: Chalcolithic, Early Bronze Age
- Location: Karak, Jordan
- Region: Ghawr Almazra'a Sub-District

History
- Built: c. 3000 BC
- Abandoned: c. 2350 BC

Site notes
- Discovered: 1924

Bab edh-Dhra (Levantine Arabic: باب الذراع, romanized: bāb iḏ-ḏrāʿ) is the site of an Early Bronze Age city located near the Dead Sea on the south bank of the wadi of al-Karak with dates in the EB IB, EB II, EB III, and EB IVA. Bab edh-Dhra was discovered in 1924 on an expedition led by William F. Albright.

== Causes of downfall; Sodom theory ==
The ancient name of Bab-edh-Dhra still remains unidentified. Some biblical scholars argue that this was the site of "Sodom". Other archaeologists disagree.

Unlike the neighboring ruins of Numeira, Bab edh-Dhra does not appear to have been destroyed by a significant fire. Numeira and Bâb edh-Dhrâʿ were destroyed at different times, about 250 years apart. While the early conclusions of Rast and Schaub that Bâb edh-Dhrâʿ and Numeira were both destroyed at approximately the same time (i.e., 2350–2067 BC), are often reported, it is now known that their individual destruction was separated by approximately two and a half centuries (250 years), with the destruction of Bâb edh-Dhrâʿ at c. 2350 BC and Numeira at c. 2600 BC. However, Kris J. Udd proposed that the date of destruction of Numeira and that of Bab edh-Dhra could be lowered to 2100-2050 BC and 2000-1950 BC respectively.

Archaeological evidence suggests that the site was abandoned by its inhabitants, but also "suffered exposure to fire".

Other possible reasons this site may not be the biblical Sodom are because the village was too small (10 acres), not in the designated geographical area (Genesis 13:10–12) and did not exist in the appropriate time period. Bab Edh-Dhraʿ was destroyed in 2350 BC (Early Bronze period), while most biblical scholars believe that the Biblical Patriarchs lived in the Middle Bronze period (2166–1550 BC).

Supporters of the Southern Sodom theory have argued that, on closer examination to the biblical account, this does fit the geographical description of where Sodom would be located. They also argue that a set time frame for its destruction is not necessarily reliable. Proponents of the Southern Sodom theory have put forward various hypotheses to explain the causes of its abandonment. Rast suggested an earthquake or an external attack. Bitumen and petroleum deposits have been found in the area, which contain sulfur and natural gas (as such deposits normally do), and one theory suggests that a pocket of natural gas led to the incineration of the city. However, archaeologists who worked at the site found no evidence of a conflagration, or indeed, any sort of catastrophe to explain the sudden desertion of its inhabitants.

== Cemetery ==
Two large cemeteries known as Khirbet Qazone (or Qayzune) are located across the modern road (highway 50) from the occupational ruins of Bab edh-Dhra and date to the earliest part of the Early Bronze Age (EBA, ca. 3300–2000 BCE) until it was finally abandoned in 2350 BC. The dates in this section of the article are reported from research on the cemeteries, published by Chesson and Schaub in 2007. Three phrases of use, with different styles of burial were used.

=== Shaft tombs ===
In the Early Bronze IA (3500–3100 BCE) shaft tombs or ossuary style graves were used with an estimated 20,000 tombs that archaeologists estimated to account for over half a million bodies. The pits varied in size from 0.6–0.9 meters (2.0–3.0 ft) in diameter and about 9 feet (2.7 meters) deep. These graves belong to the pre-urban period of the site and date to about 3150-3000 BC.

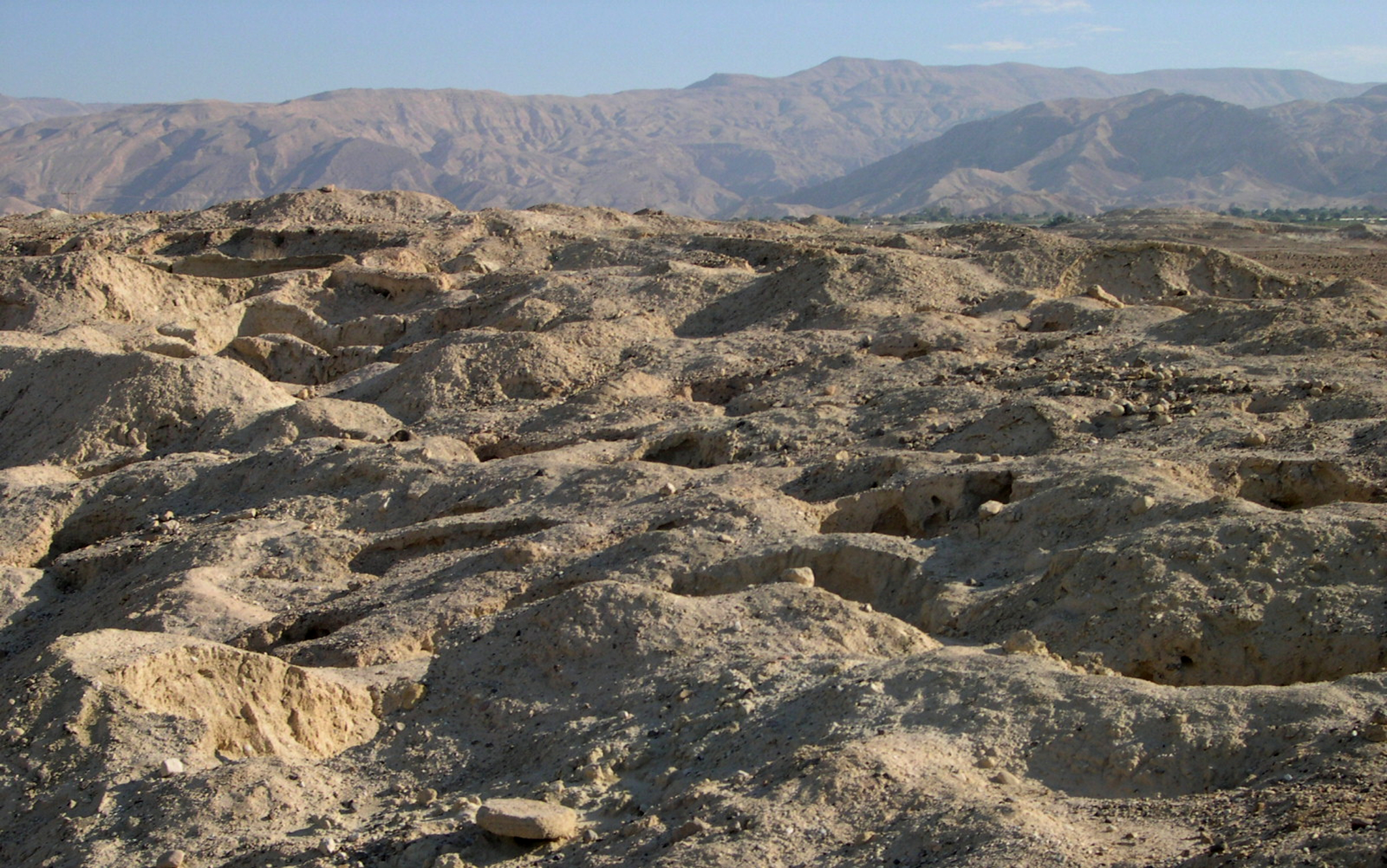
Early Bronze Age IA shaft tombs disturbed by looters, Bab edh-Dhra cemetery

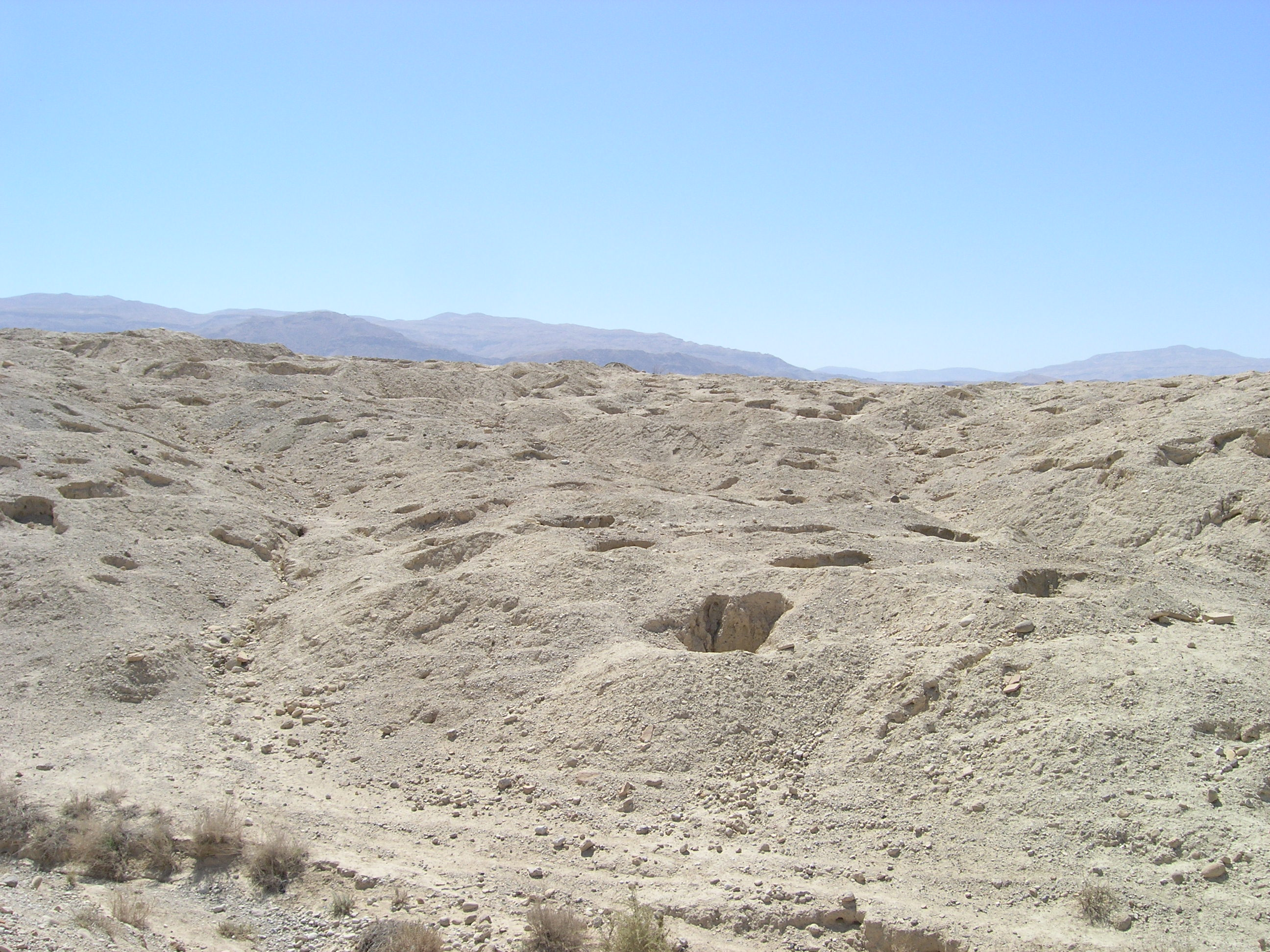
Bab edh-Dhra, hill with Bronze Age shaft graves (Cemetery A)

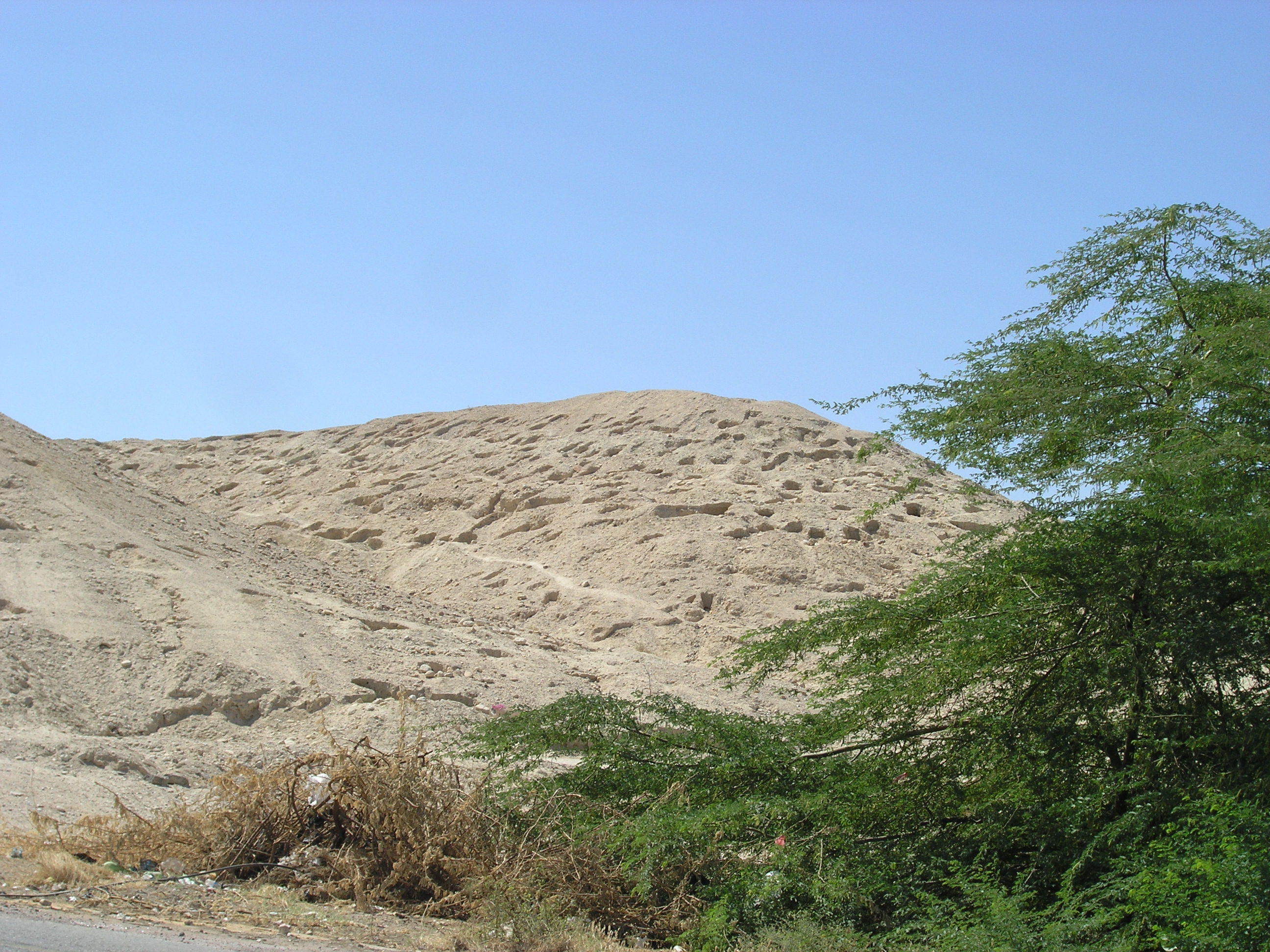
Bab edh-Dhra, hill with Bronze Age shaft graves (Cemetery A)

=== Charnel houses ===
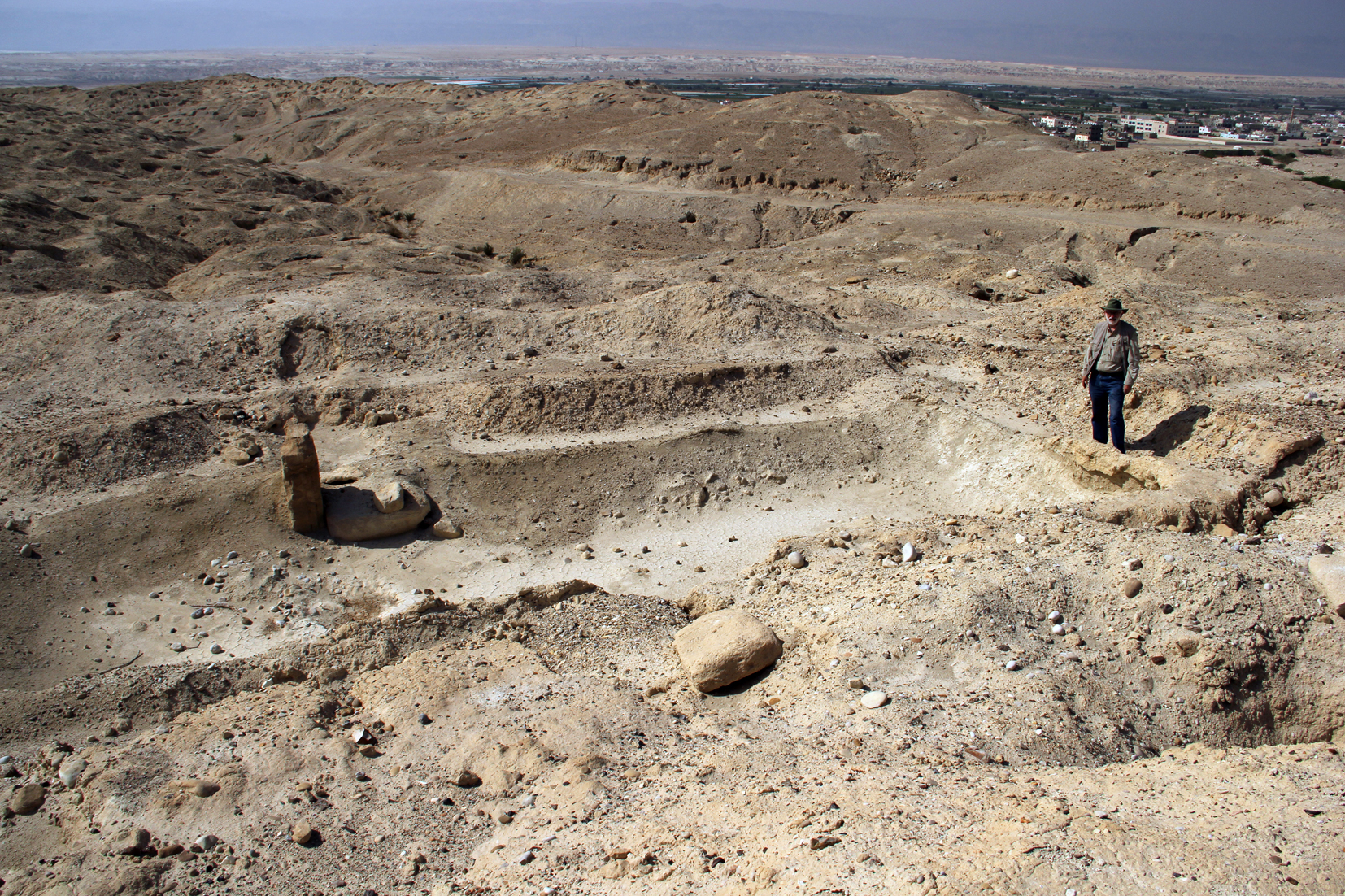
Early Bronze Age III charnel house, Bab edh-Dhra cemetery

In the Early Bronze II (3100–2650 BCE) and III period (2650–2350 BCE) the method used for burial was rectangular mudbrick buildings called charnel houses or "body libraries." All the human remains identified at Bâb edh-Dhrâʿ, have been confined to the cemetery (charnel house tombs) and are not found in the destruction layer of the city.

Around 2900 BCE the residents of Bab edh-Dhra abandoned the subterranean shaft tombs for above-ground rectangular charnel houses in the cemetery. The rectangular charnel houses resembled the residential houses of the cities but with steps inside that led down to a pebbled floor where among the deceased were placed personal items such as beads, textiles, pottery and other objects of stone and metal. The destruction of the charnel houses occurred during the destruction of the city in 2350 BCE. There were four houses excavated and two others partially excavated with well dressed orthostats door posts, each over a meter in height, with a wooden door frame and inside the threshold the floor was packed with skulls and pottery. The buildings varied in size from 11.50 X 5.50 meters (37x18 ft) to 7 x 5 meters (23 x 16 ft).

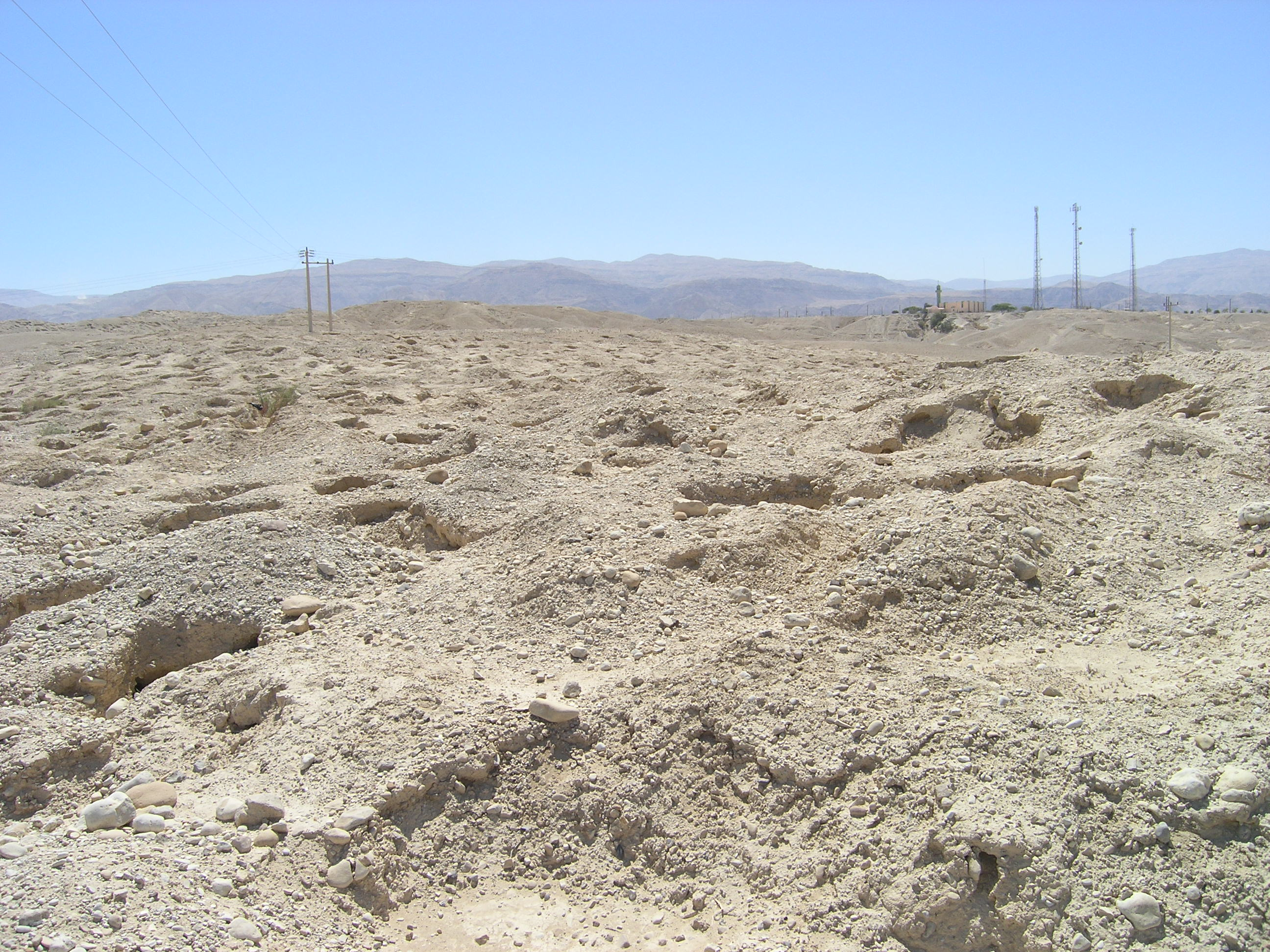
Bab edh-Dhra, Bronze Age burial ground in the plain (Cemetery C)

=== Tumulus tombs ===
The cairn burial (or tumulus tomb), that dated to the Early Bronze Age III (2650-2300 BCE), was the latest burial form found at the site. They were above-ground circular tombs made from mudbrick (circular charnel houses) in which were found evidence of various mortuary practices. The tomb was a shallow pit where the body is laid with pottery and a dagger with a round heap of stones piled on top (thus called Tumulus). It was the tombs used by those who conquered the city and burned it.

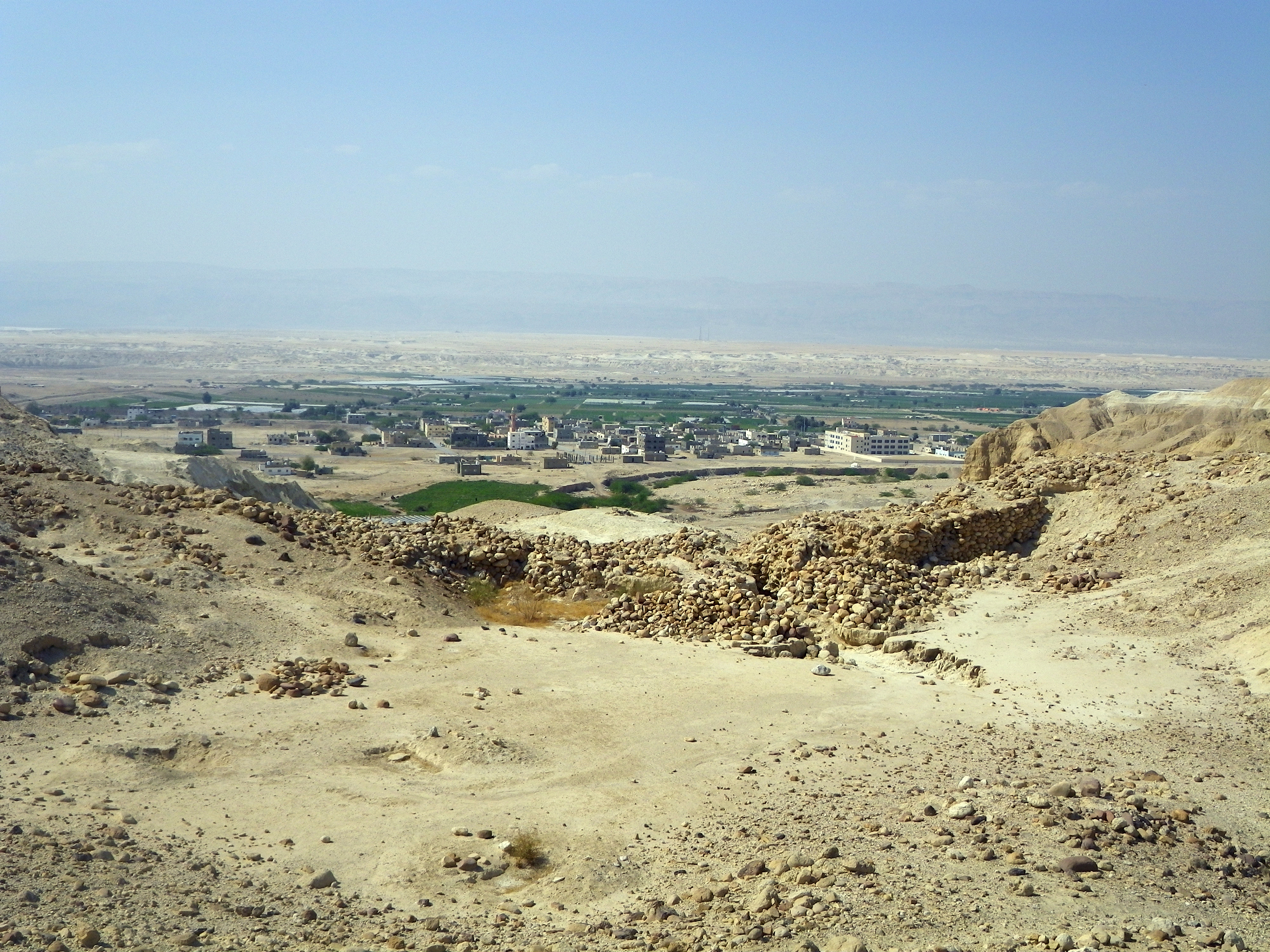
The early Bronze gate of Bab edh-Dhra overlooking the southern end of the Dead Sea.

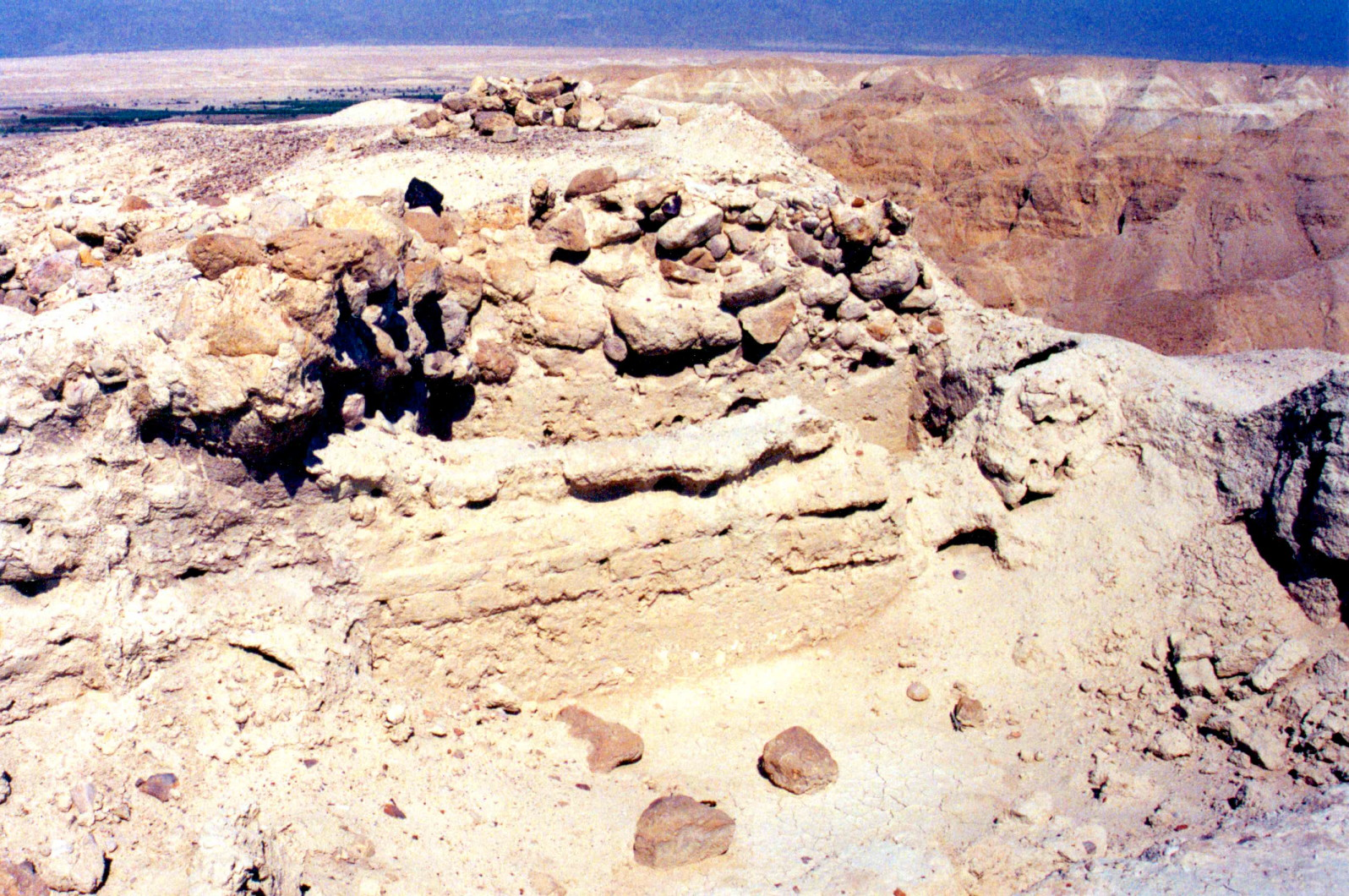
Bab edh-Dhra EB mudbrick view to NW

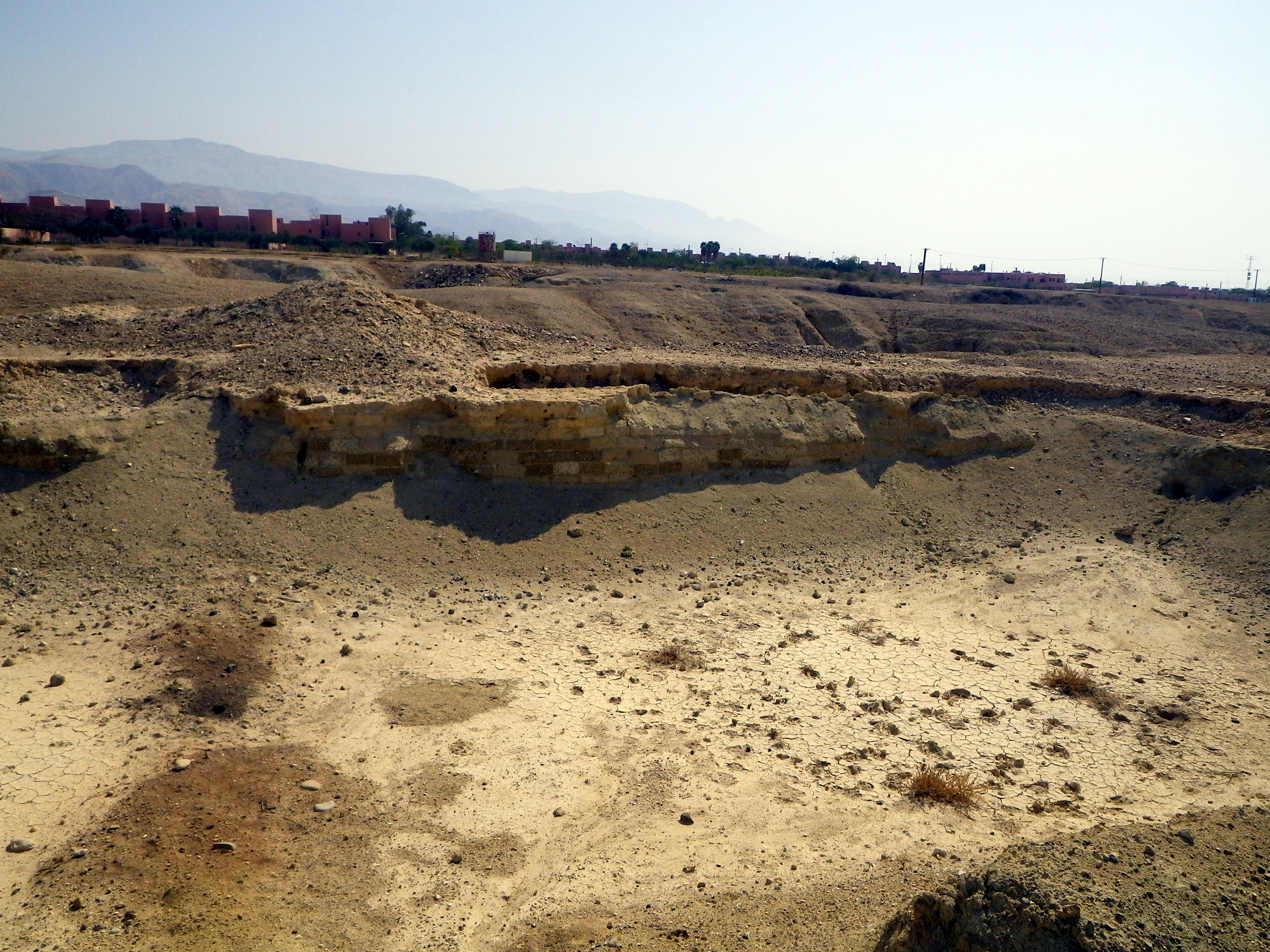
An exposed Early Bronze mud brick building at Bab edh-Dhra in 2014.

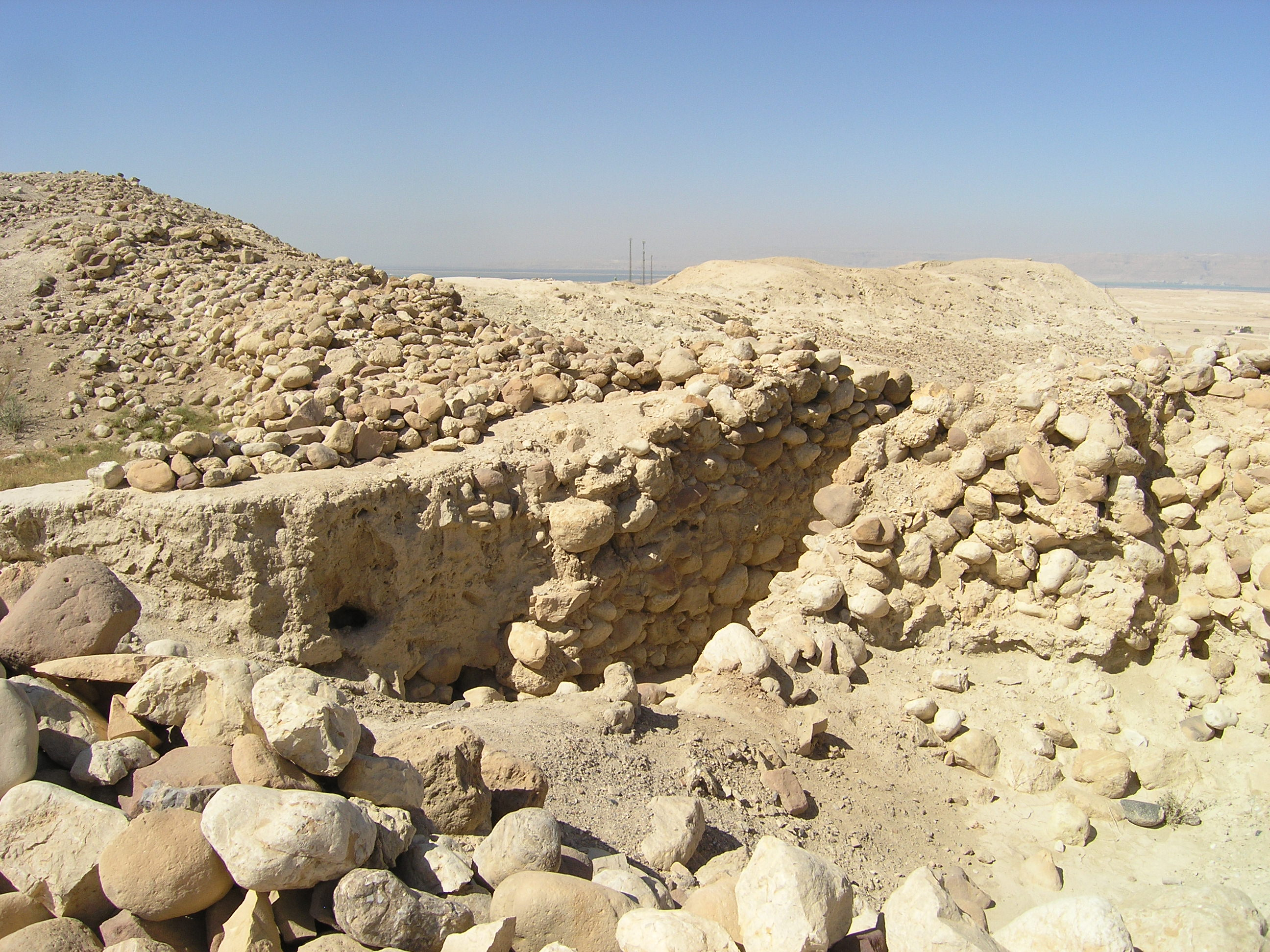
Bab edh-Dhra, wall remnants of the Bronze Age city

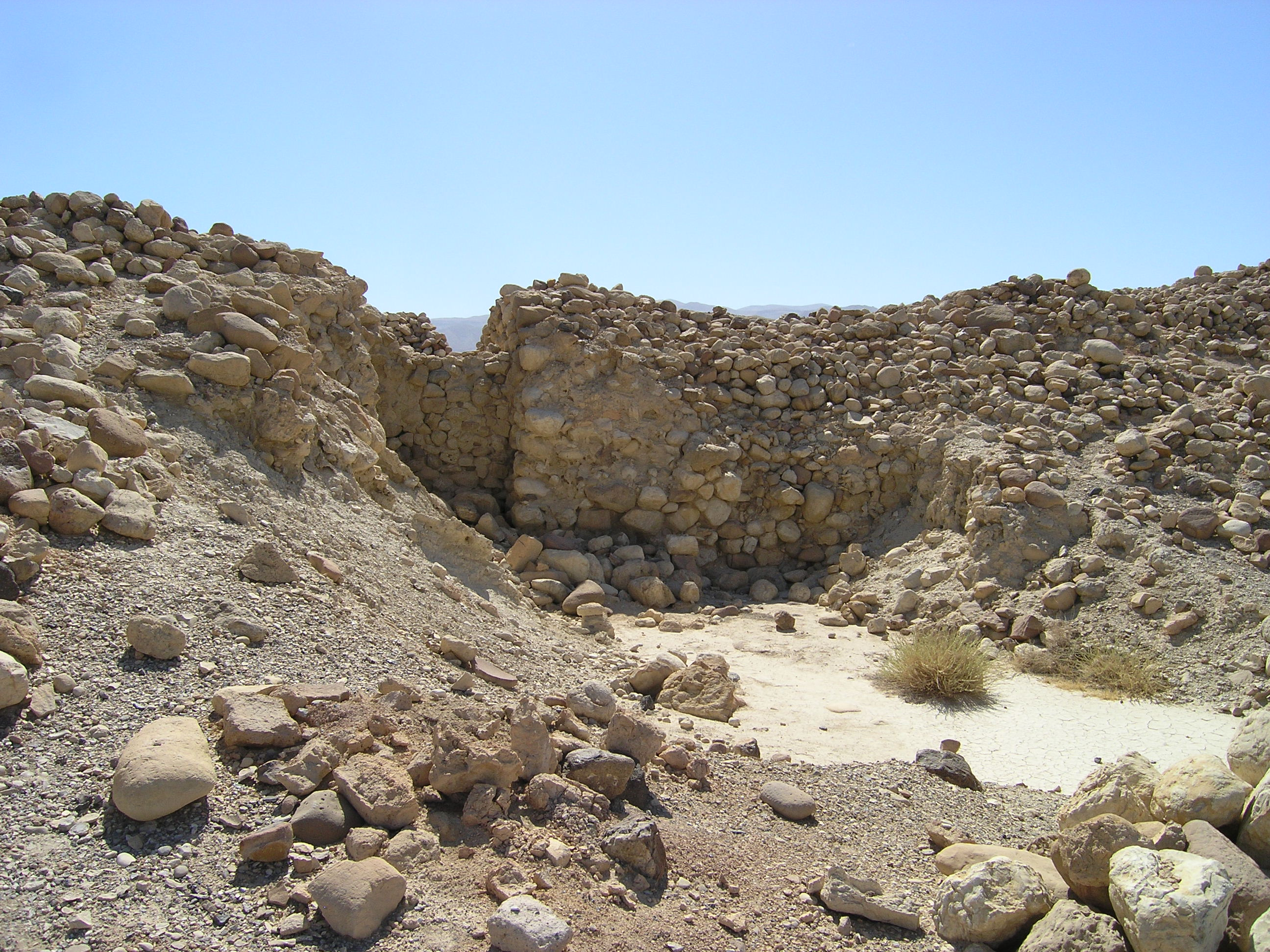
Bab edh-Dhra, wall remnants of the Bronze Age city

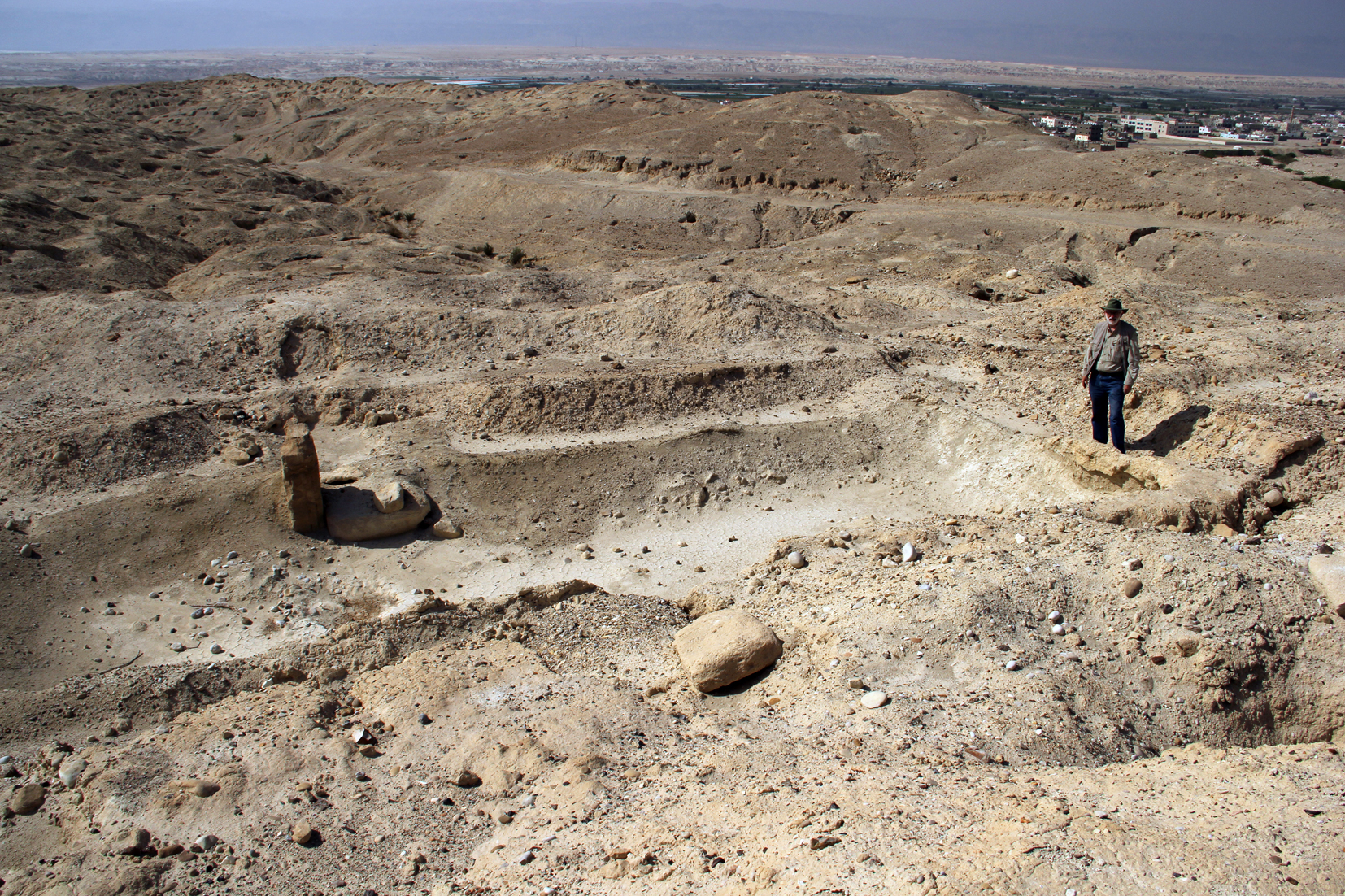
Early Bronze Age III charnel house, Bab edh-Dhra cemetery

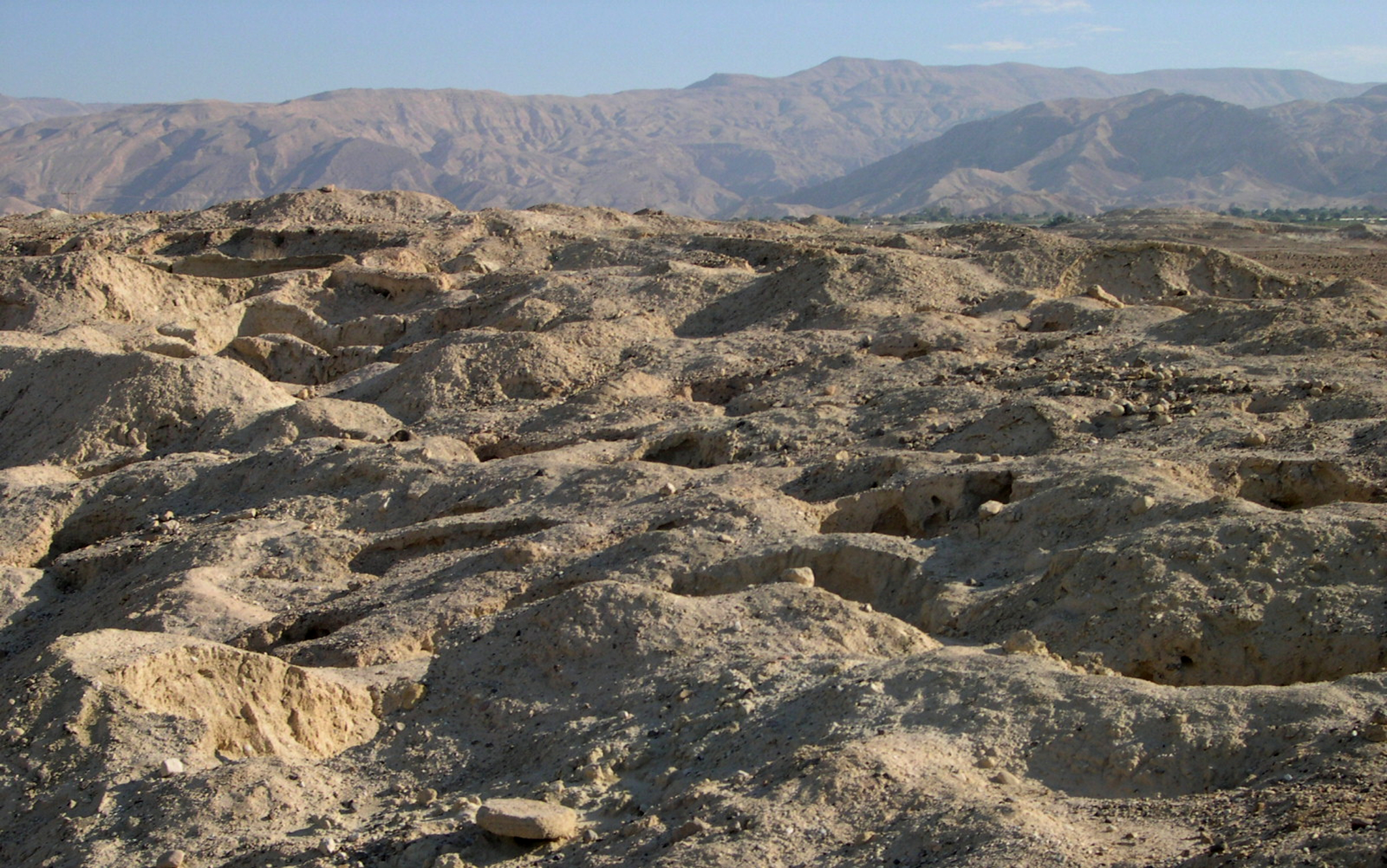
Early Bronze Age IA shaft tombs disturbed by looters, Bab edh-Dhra cemetery

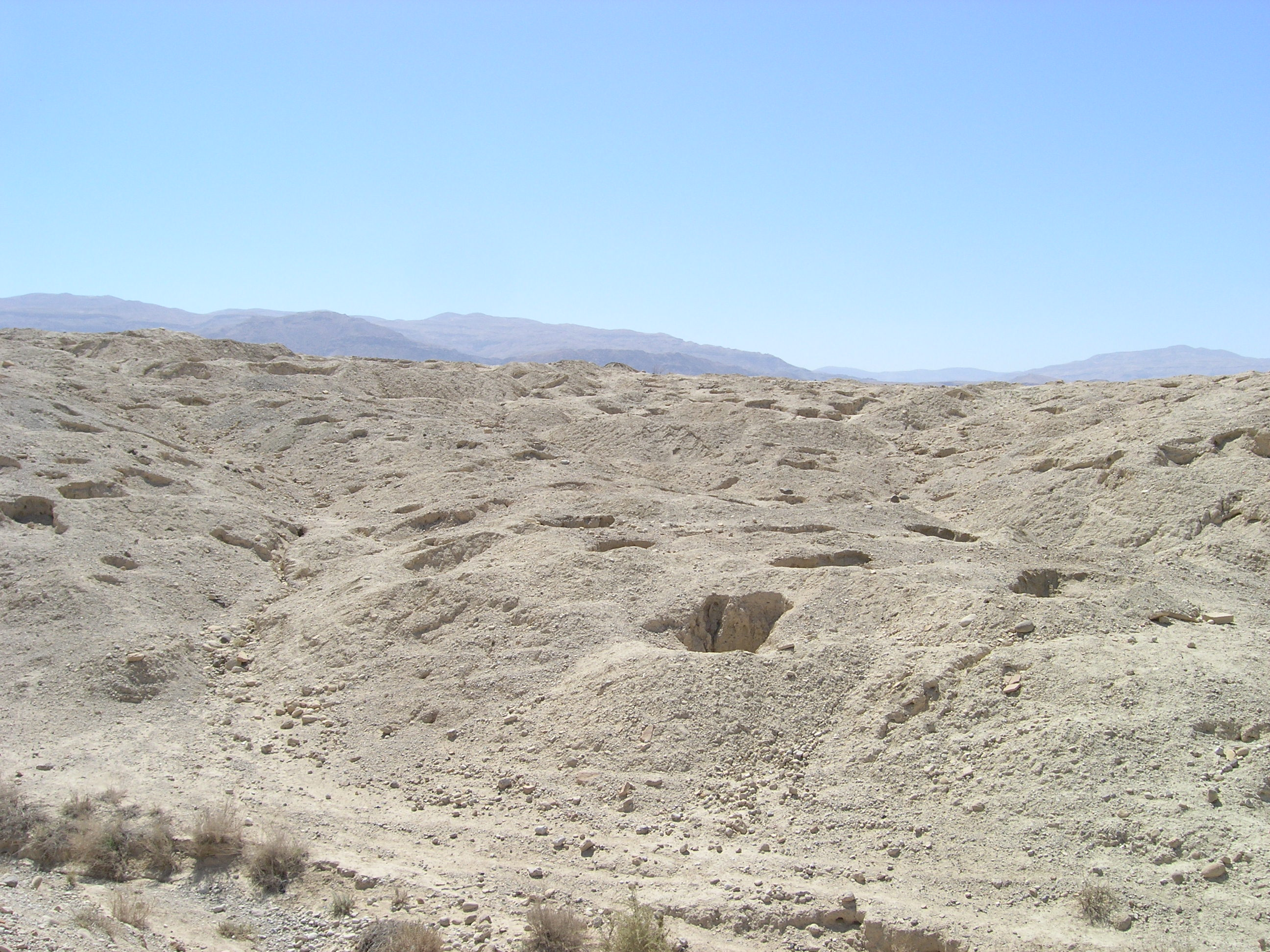
Bab edh-Dhra, hill with Bronze Age shaft graves (Cemetery A)

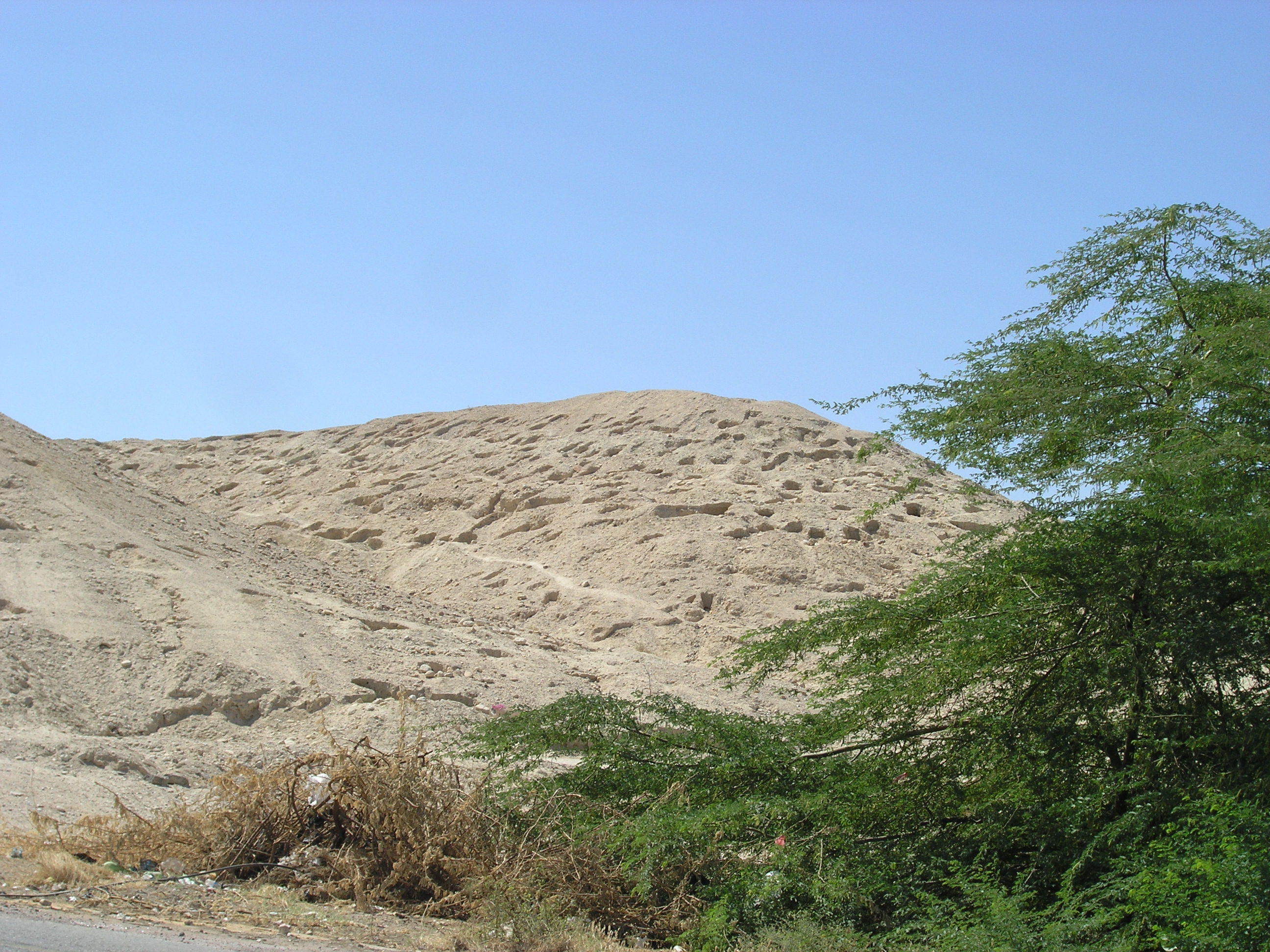
Bab edh-Dhra, hill with Bronze Age shaft graves (Cemetery A)

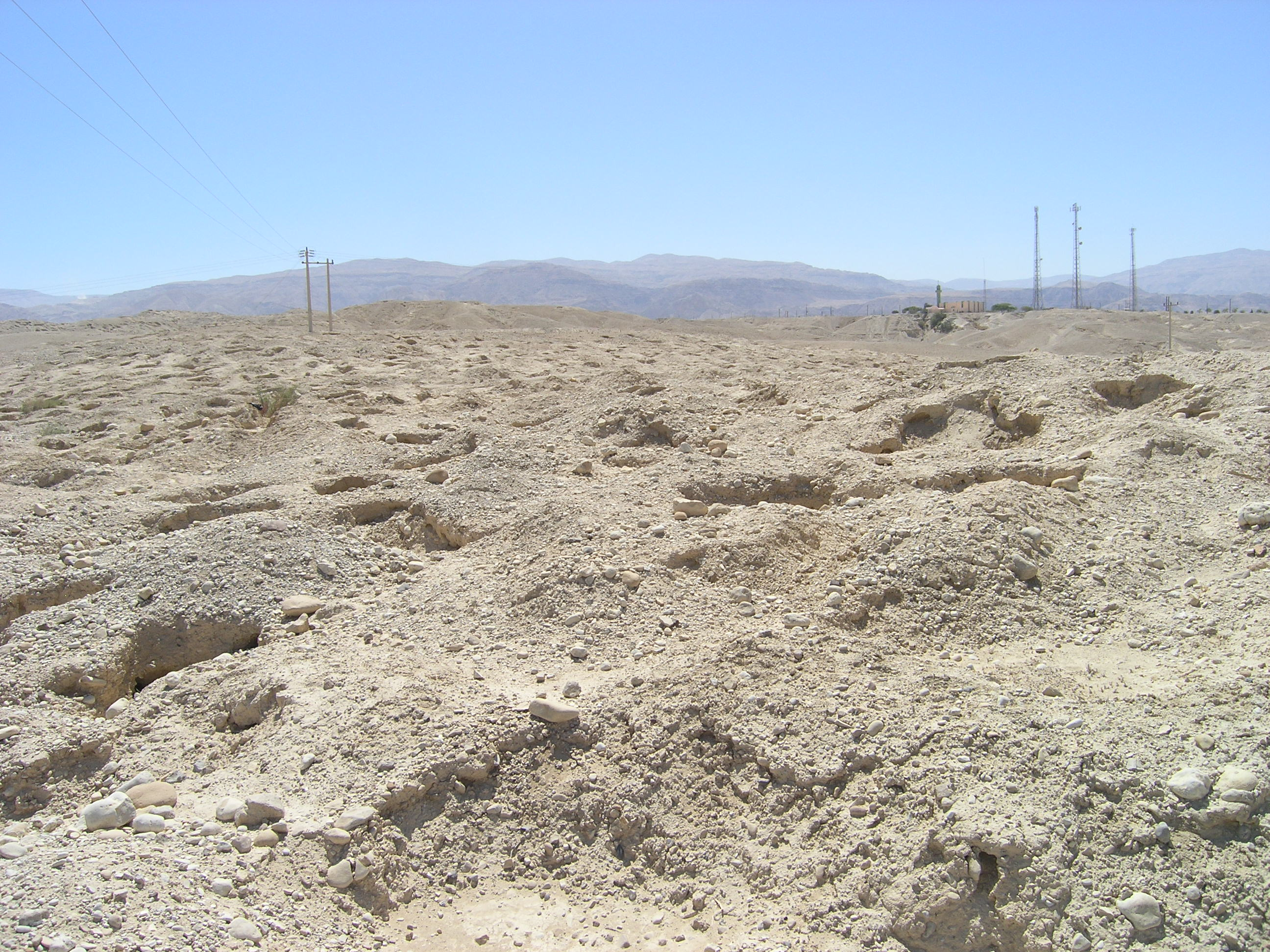
Bab edh-Dhra, Bronze Age burial ground in the plain (Cemetery C)

== Museums ==
Artifacts from Bab edh-Dhra are on display at Museum at the Lowest Place on Earth, Jordan; Karak Archaeological Museum in Jordan; the Kelso Bible Lands Museum housed at Pittsburgh Theological Seminary in Pittsburgh, United States; The Gustav Jeeninga Museum of Bible and Near Eastern Studies in Anderson, United States; and the British Museum in London, United Kingdom.

== Literature ==
- Chesson, Meredith S., and R. Thomas Schaub. "Death and Dying on the Dead Sea Plain: Fifa, Al- Khanazir and Bab Adh-Dhra` Cemeteries". In Crossing Jordan: North American Contributions to the Archaeology of Jordan, edited by Thomas Evan Levy, P. M. Michèle Daviau, Randall W. Younker, and May Shaer, 253–60. London: Equinox, 2007.
- Chesson, Meredith S., and R. Thomas Schaub. "Life in the Earliest Walled Towns on the Dead Sea Plain: Numayra and Bab Edh-Dhraʿ". In Crossing Jordan: North American Contributions to the Archaeology of Jordan, edited by Thomas Evan Levy, P. M. Michèle Daviau, Randall W. Younker, and May Shaer, 245–52. London: Equinox, 2007.
- Graves, David E. The Location of Sodom: Key Facts for Navigating the Maze of Arguments for the Location of the Cities of the Plain. Toronto: Electronic Christian Media, 2016. ISBN 978-1985830837
- Rast, Walter E. "Patterns of Settlement at Bab Edh-Dhraʿ". In The Southeastern Dead Sea Plain Expedition: An Interim Report of the 1977 Season, edited by R. Thomas Schaub and Walter E. Rast, 7–34. AASOR 46. Boston, MA: American Schools of Oriental Research, 1979.
- Rast, Walter E. and R. Thomas Schaub, eds. Bâb edh-Dhrâ'. Excavations at the Town Site (1975–1981). Reports of the Expedition to the Dead Sea Plain, Jordan 2. Winona Lake: Eisenbrauns, 2003. ISBN 978-1-57506-088-0
- Rast, Walter E. and R. Thomas Schaub "Survey of the Southeastern Plain of the Dead Sea, 1973". Annual of the Department of Antiquities of Jordan 19 (1974): 5–53, 175–85.
- Rast, Walter E., R. Thomas Schaub, David W. McCreery, Jack Donahue, and Mark A. McConaughy. "Preliminary Report of the 1979 Expedition to the Dead Sea Plain, Jordan". Bulletin of the American Schools of Oriental Research 240 (1980): 21–61.
- Schaub, R. Thomas. "Bab Edh-Dhraʿ". In The New Encyclopedia of Archaeological Excavations in the Holy Land, edited by Ephraim Stern, Ayelet Levinson-Gilboa, and Joseph Aviram, 1:130–36. Jerusalem: The Israel Exploration Society, 1993.
- Schaub, R. Thomas. "Bab Edh-Dhraʿ". In The Oxford Encyclopedia of Archaeology in the Near East, edited by Eric M. Meyers, 1:248–51. Oxford: Oxford University Press, 1997.
- Schaub, R. Thomas. "Southeast Dead Sea Plain". In The Oxford Encyclopedia of Archaeology in the Near East, edited by Eric M. Meyers, 5:62–64. Oxford,: Oxford University Press, 1997.
- Schaub, R. Thomas, and Walter E. Rast. "Preliminary Report of the 1981 Expedition to the Dead Sea Plain, Jordan". Bulletin of the American Schools of Oriental Research, no. 254 (1984): 35–60.
- Schaub, R. Thomas, and Walter E. Rast, eds.: Bab edh-Dhra': Excavations in the Cemetery Directed by Paul W. Lapp (1965—1967), Reports of the Expedition to the Dead Sea Plain, Jordan 1. Winona Lake: Eisenbrauns 1989. ISBN 978-0-931464-51-5
