= Museum at the Lowest Place on Earth =

Coordinates: 31.050432°N 35.502295°E

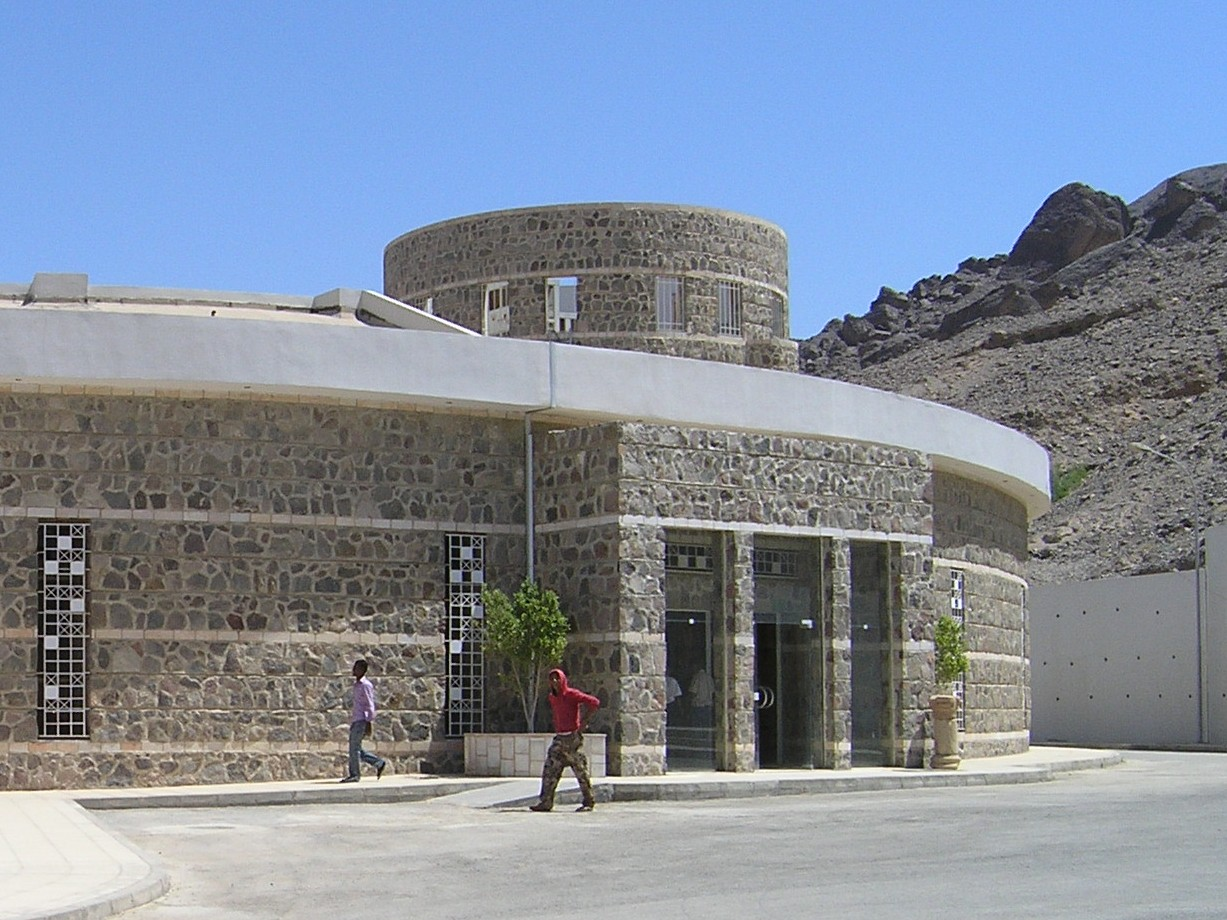
- Established: May 12, 2012
- Location: Ghor es-Safi, Aghwar Janoobiyah District, Jordan
- Architect: George Hakim

The Museum at the Lowest Place on Earth (Arabic: متحف أخفض مكان على الأرض) is an archaeological museum located in the Ghor es-Safi, Jordan.

== History ==
The idea for the creation of the museum dates back to the 1990s, when it was proposed by the Greek archaeologist Konstantinos Politis and the Jordanian Department of Antiquities after excavations in the wider area around Ghor es-Safi. The Arab Potash Company (APC) originally financed the construction of the museum in 1996. The APC entrusted George Hakim with designing the museum building. In 2004, the government of Jordan financed the construction. In 2006, the museum building was completed. In 2007, the Ministry of Tourism and Antiquities of Jordan contacted the Hellenic Society for Near Eastern Studies headed by Prof. Politis to complete the design of some of the museum's exhibits. The museum was inaugurated in 2012.

== Collections ==
The museum contains collections of 5,000-year-old Bronze Age ceramics, Greco-Roman vestments discovered at Khirbat Qayzun, Christian tombstones from Zoara, and a complete mosaic pavement from the Sanctuary of St Lot.

The museum contains a laboratory for the restoration of antiquities, mainly dealing with mosaics.

In addition, the museum has displays of handicraft products from communities in Jordan.

== Gallery ==
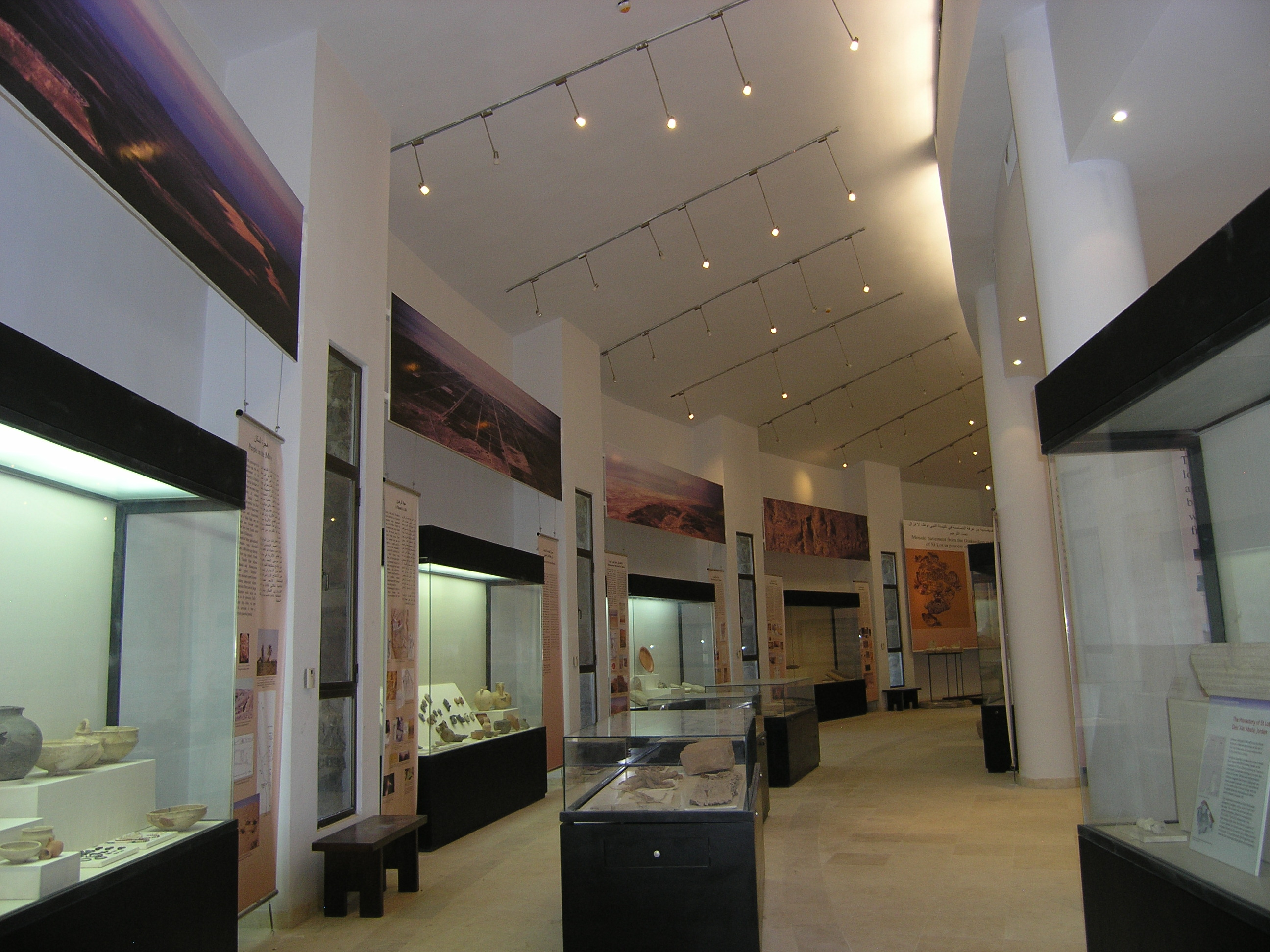
Museum hall

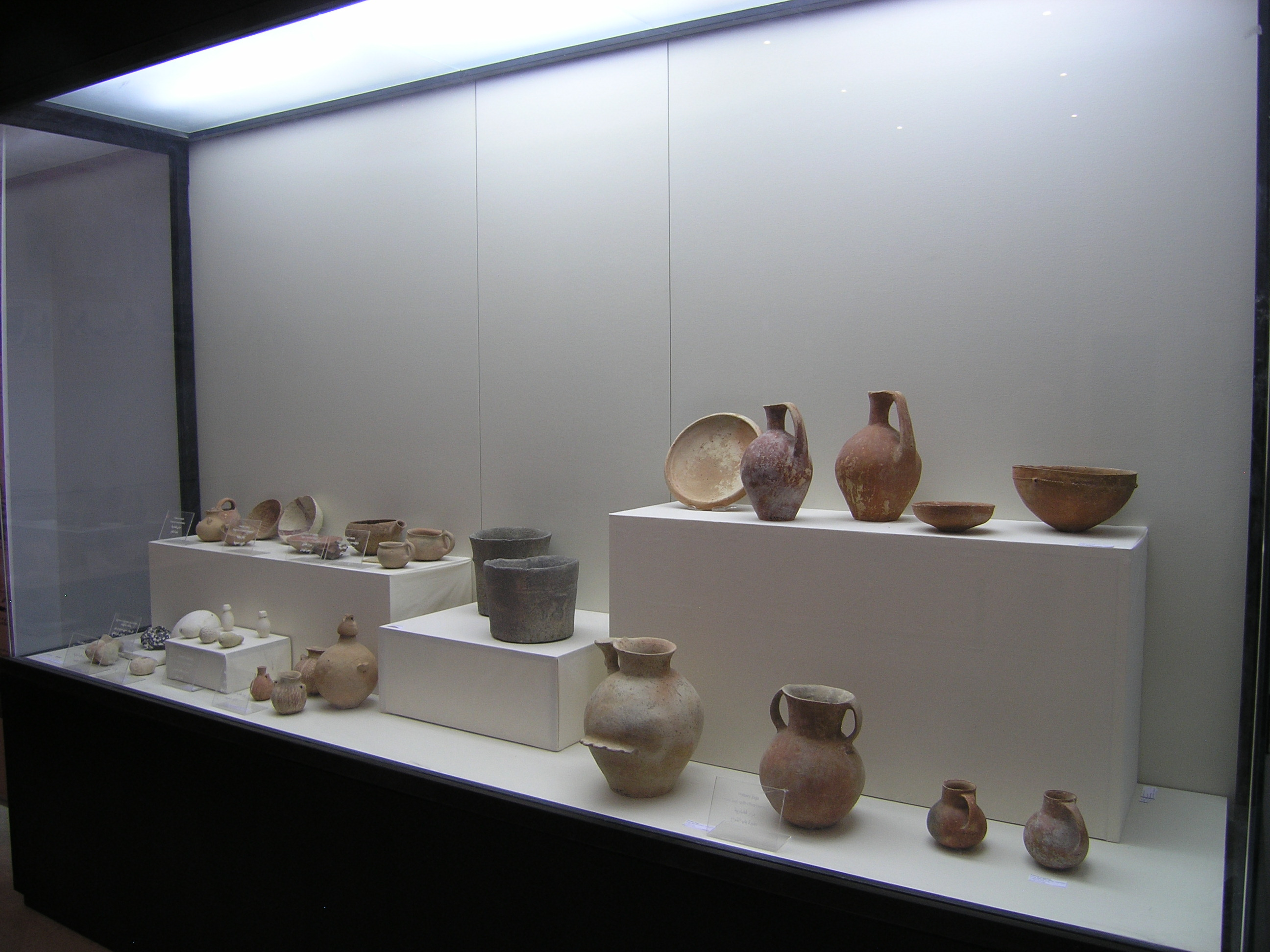
Antique pottery

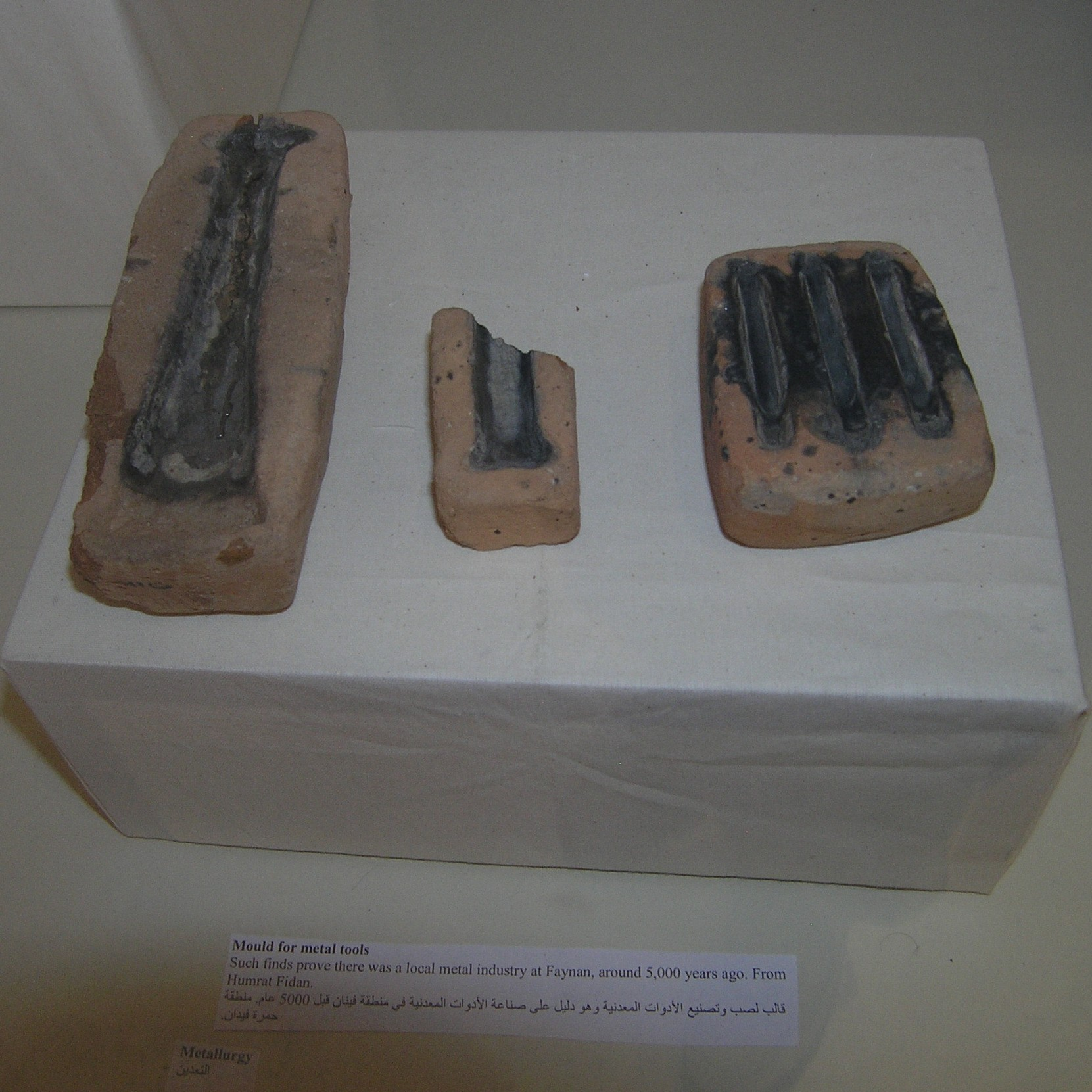
Bronze Age mould for metal tools, Faynan
