= Ghor es-Safi =

Archaeological site in Jordan

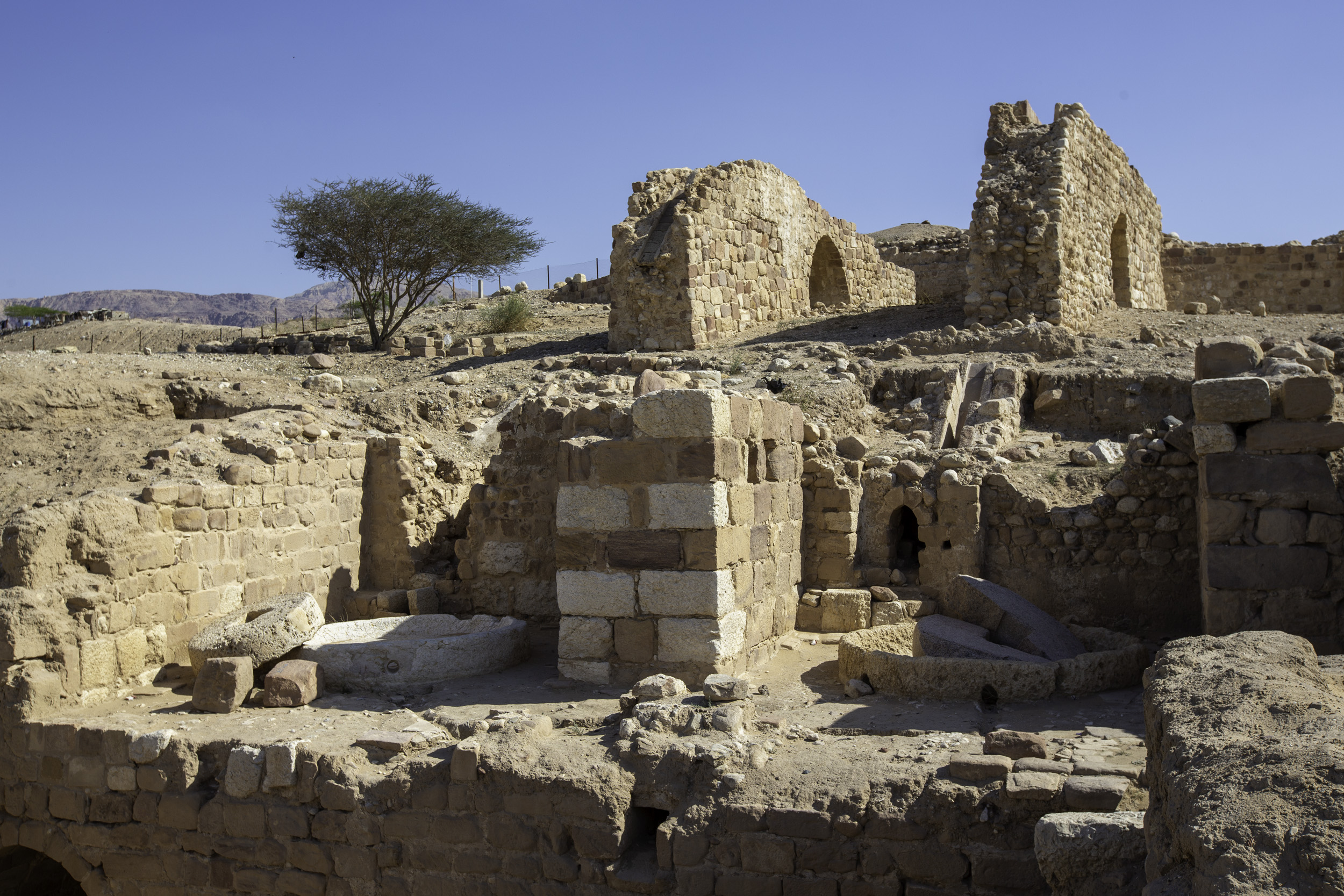
Sugar cane factories at Ghor al-Safi

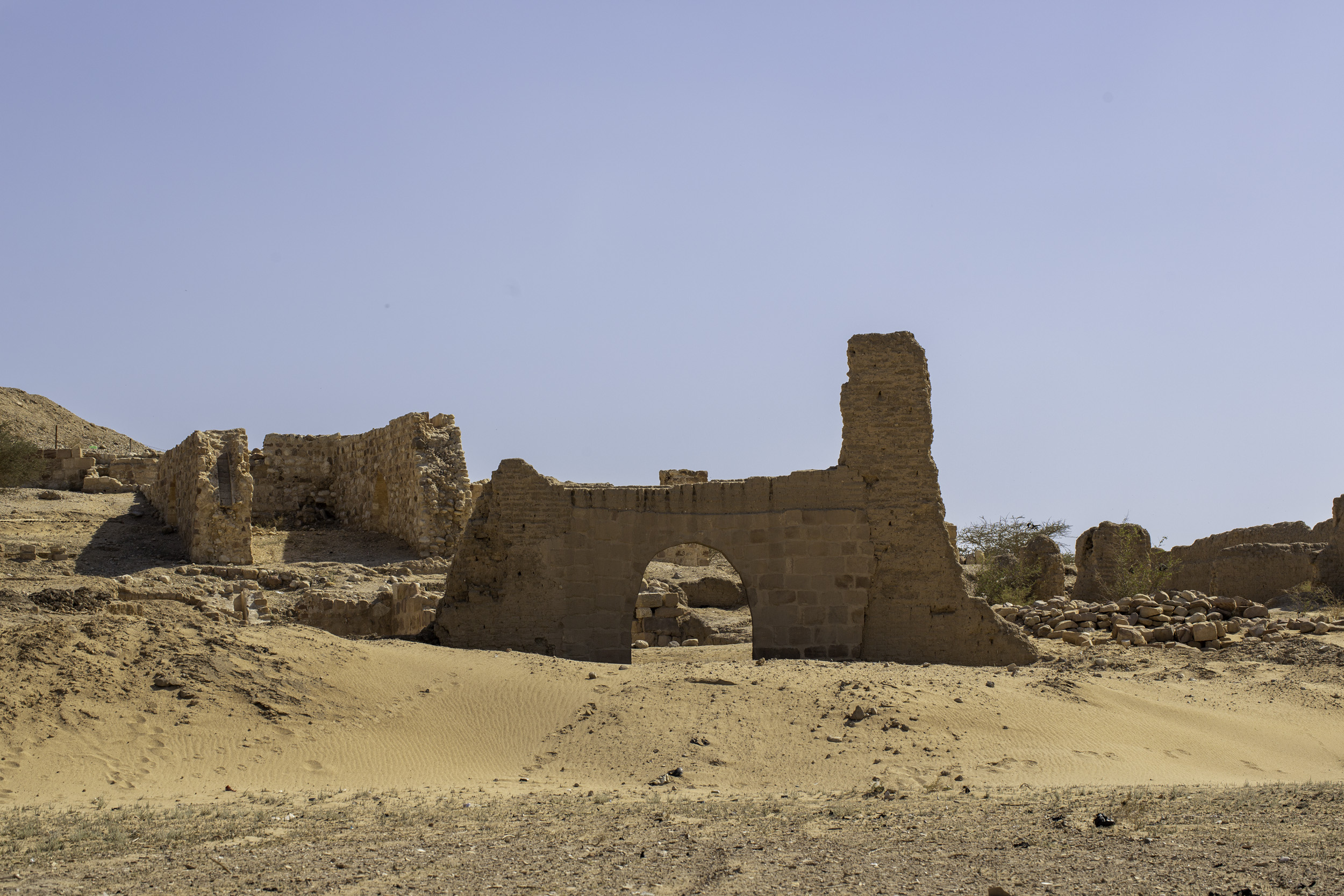
Another view of the sugar cane factories at Ghor al-Safi

Ghor es-Safi, also transliterated Ghawr as-Safi, is an area in the Jordan Valley located in the Wadi al-Hasa. It is situated between the governorates of Karak and Tafilah, near the southern Dead Sea. The location is depicted on the 6th-century Madaba map as "Zoara."

Ghor as-Safi is perhaps best known for its historical sugar cane factories from the 11th century.

== Archaeology ==
Many excavations were facilitated by the Hellenic Society for Near Eastern Studies (HSNES) and the Department of Antiquities of Jordan since the 1990s, and Konstantinos D. Politis directed most of these archaeological projects. Archaeological work was ongoing as of at least 2017.

Archaeological investigation at Tawahin es-Sukkar and other sites in the area suggest "a population with a Nabataean character living on the south-eastern shores of the Dead Sea from the 1st-6th centuries A.D." Finds at the site suggest presence of human settlement for several different historical eras: 8th to 9th, 12th to 14th, 15th to 16th, and 20th centuries (including the Early Bronze, Byzantine, and late Islamic Periods).

=== Tawahin es-Sukkar sugar cane factory ===
Efforts were mostly focused on learning about a sugar factory located at sub-site Tawahin as-Sukkar (also known as Tawahin es-Sukkar or Maṣna‘ as-Sukkar).

Locally produced sugar would have been sold as an export throughout the world; sugar is considered by some scholars to have been the "cash crop" of the southern Levant during the medieval period.

There is both an eastern and western pressing room which helped archaeologists understand the settlement and agricultural patterns at the site since 12,000 years ago. The pressing rooms are accompanied by a penstock used for irrigation and water resource management. It is believed that a building nearby to the pressing rooms was used to boil the raw sugar cane in order to make refined sugar, based on sugar fragment evidence displayed at the site. Sugar and molasses pots were among the materials recovered during excavations.

=== Lot's Cave ===
Also near this location is Deir 'Ain 'Abata / Saint Lot's Cave, with the excavated ruins of the Byzantine Monastery of St Lot. The monastery consists of a triple-apsed basilical church, flanked by a large seven-metre deep arched reservoir to the south and a refectory and hostel to the north. Several hermit cells are found above and to the south of the monastery.

The site has evidence of a fourth-century AD origin as a Christian place of pilgrimage, with Nabataean and Roman pottery suggesting earlier occupation. Early and Middle Bronze Age finds may indicate the site was considered sacred by later inhabitants. However, the sanctuary itself was constructed by April 606, as indicated by a Greek mosaic floor inscription, with a renovation dated Xanthikos (roughly May) 691. The place was visited by St. Stephen from Mar Saba Monastery in the late eighth century and by the Russian Abbot Daniel in 1106–1107. The final period of occupation is dated to the late eighth–early ninth century, evidenced by Abbasid-period pottery, glass, and inscriptions.

=== Babatha ===
Maḥoza, the hometown of Babatha, a Jewish refugee from the early 2nd century known for her extensive surviving personal documents found in the Judaean Desert, is believed to have been located in the Ghor es-Safi.

== Tourism ==
Ghor es-Safi houses the Museum at the Lowest Place on Earth, which displays many archaeological discoveries from the surrounding area. Since 2014 especially, work has been done to conserve the Tawahin as-Sukkar archaeological site and make it accessible to visitors. Agro-tourism is a growing source of employment in Safi, such as through the Jordan Southern Ghawr Company.

== Geology ==
The area of Ghor es-Safi is characterized by the Saramuji conglomerates dating back to the Proterozoic, somewhere between 595 and 600 Mya (million years ago). The area's geological origin could be associated with similar conglomerate formations from the Upper Proterozoic, such as those in Shammar and several areas of the Arabian-Nubian Shield. The area around Ghor es-Safi is composed of alternating horizons of boulder conglomerates and arkosic sandstone (the latter with green impurities due to chlorite and epidote from early metamorphism).

== Climate ==
Climate data for Ghor es-Safi (1997–2015, −350 metres (−1,150 ft) below sea level)
Month	Jan	Feb	Mar	Apr	May	Jun	Jul	Aug	Sep	Oct	Nov	Dec	Year
Record high °C (°F)	28.0 (82.4)	32.0 (89.6)	40.0 (104.0)	41.8 (107.2)	47.2 (117.0)	46.8 (116.2)	48.6 (119.5)	46.9 (116.4)	45.0 (113.0)	41.4 (106.5)	35.6 (96.1)	30.5 (86.9)	48.6 (119.5)
Mean daily maximum °C (°F)	21.7 (71.1)	23.2 (73.8)	27.0 (80.6)	31.2 (88.2)	35.8 (96.4)	39.1 (102.4)	41.4 (106.5)	40.8 (105.4)	37.8 (100.0)	33.7 (92.7)	28.0 (82.4)	22.9 (73.2)	31.9 (89.4)
Daily mean °C (°F)	16.3 (61.3)	17.8 (64.0)	21.2 (70.2)	25.0 (77.0)	29.1 (84.4)	32.5 (90.5)	34.8 (94.6)	34.9 (94.8)	32.4 (90.3)	28.5 (83.3)	22.4 (72.3)	17.5 (63.5)	26.0 (78.8)
Mean daily minimum °C (°F)	10.9 (51.6)	12.4 (54.3)	15.4 (59.7)	18.7 (65.7)	22.6 (72.7)	25.8 (78.4)	28.1 (82.6)	28.9 (84.0)	27.1 (80.8)	23.2 (73.8)	16.9 (62.4)	12.1 (53.8)	20.2 (68.4)
Record low °C (°F)	1.7 (35.1)	3.1 (37.6)	6.0 (42.8)	6.2 (43.2)	15.7 (60.3)	21.5 (70.7)	24.3 (75.7)	23.9 (75.0)	22.0 (71.6)	14.0 (57.2)	5.2 (41.4)	4.9 (40.8)	1.7 (35.1)
Average precipitation mm (inches)	15.0 (0.59)	14.6 (0.57)	8.7 (0.34)	3.1 (0.12)	3.7 (0.15)	0.0 (0.0)	0.0 (0.0)	0.0 (0.0)	0.2 (0.01)	10.4 (0.41)	4.7 (0.19)	10.5 (0.41)	70.8 (2.79)
Average precipitation days (≥ 1 mm)	3.1	2.9	1.9	0.7	0.2	0.0	0.0	0.0	0.1	0.8	1.1	2.3	13.0
Mean monthly sunshine hours	151.9	161.0	217.0	252.0	300.7	345.0	356.5	331.7	285.0	235.6	186.0	158.1	2,980.5
Mean daily sunshine hours	4.9	5.7	7.0	8.4	9.7	11.5	11.5	10.7	9.5	7.6	6.2	5.1	8.2
Source: Deutscher Wetterdienst
