= Zoara =

One of a cluster of five biblical cities

Coordinates: 31°02′49″N 35°30′09″E

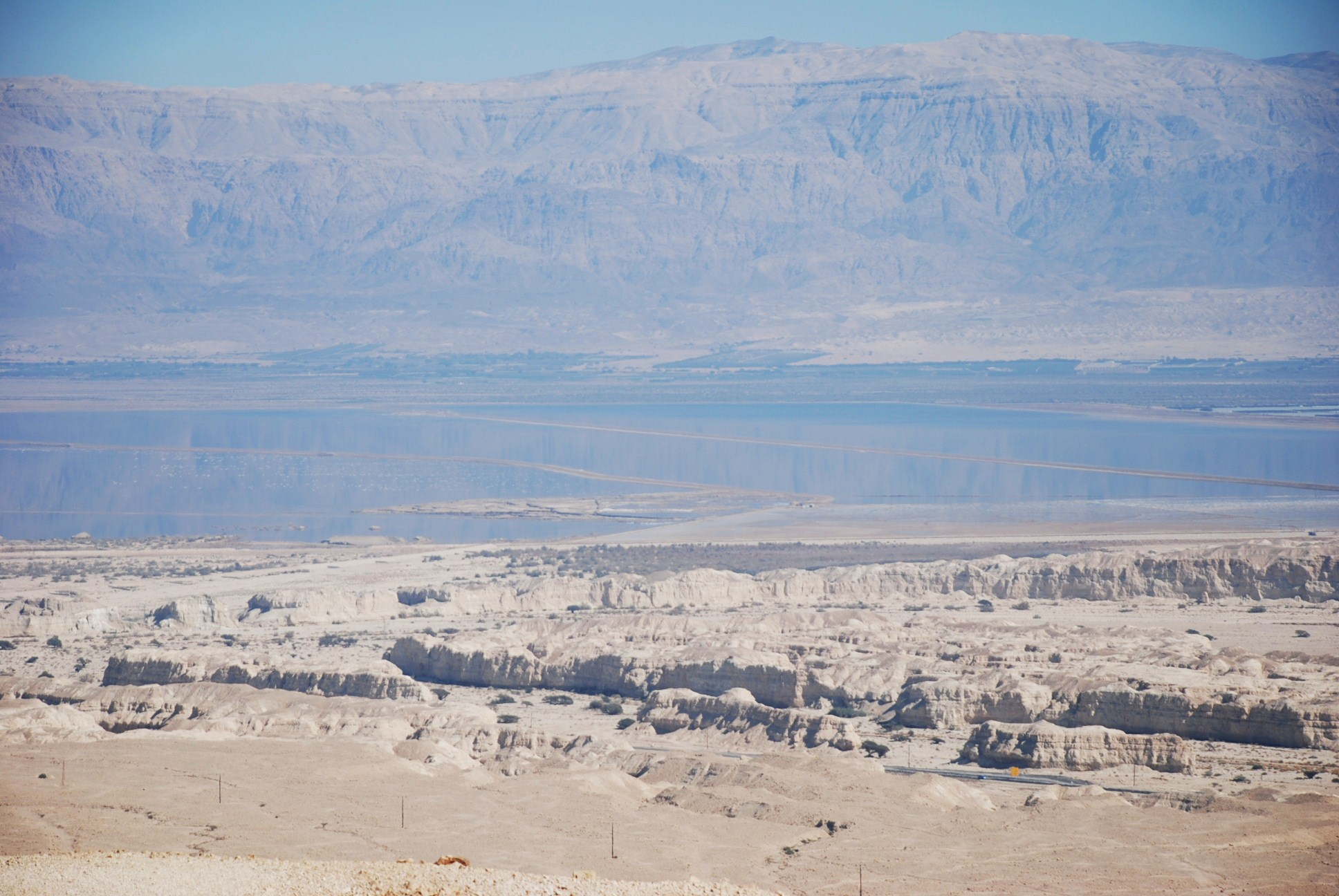
Proposed location of Zoara, As-Safi

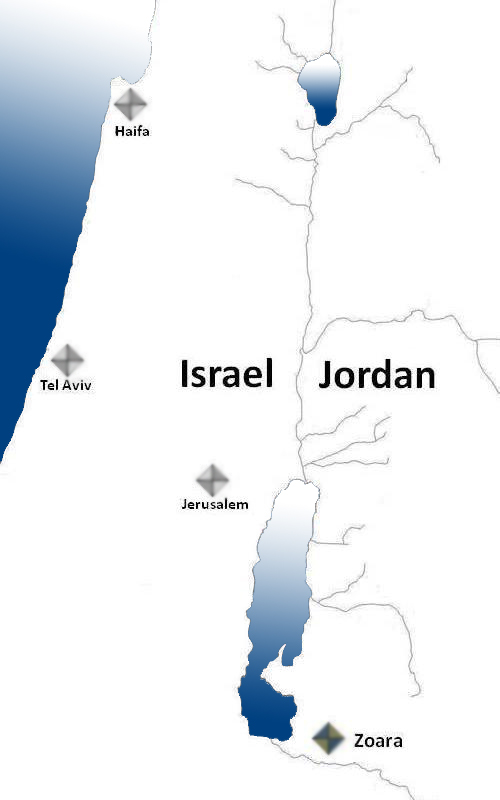

Bela, also called Zoar or Tzoar, (Note: Arabic: زعر. Hebrew: צֹעַר, romanized: Ṣōʿar.) in the Hebrew Bible, Segor (Note: Ancient Greek: Σηγώρ, romanized: Sēgṓr.) in the Septuagint, and Zughar (Note: Arabic: صُوغَر, romanized: Ṣūġar.) by medieval Arabs, was an ancient city located in the Dead Sea basin in the Transjordan.

Biblical Zoar is described in the Book of Genesis as one of the five "cities of the plain" – a pentapolis at the time of Abram/Abraham (see Patriarchal age), situated in a highly fertile valley mentioned in the Genesis, apparently stretching along the lower Jordan Valley and the Dead Sea plain. The biblical narrative shows the city being spared the "brimstone and fire" which destroyed Sodom and Gomorrah in order to provide a refuge for Lot and his daughters.

The town of Zoara, located at modern-day Ghor es-Safi in Jordan, is mentioned in the 1st–5th centuries CE by various geographers and historians. The Catholic Encyclopedia, writing about the time preceding the Crusades, called it "a flourishing oasis where the balsam, indigo, and date trees bloom luxuriantly". Arab authors of the 10th century mention its indigo production and praise its dates.

== Biblical narrative ==
Zoar, meaning "small" or "insignificant" in Hebrew, was a city east of Jordan in the vale of Siddim, near the Dead Sea. Lot referred to it as "just a little place". Along with Sodom, Gomorrah, Admah, and Zeboim, Zoar was one of the five cities who rebelled against the hegemony of Chedorlaomer, and were destined by God for destruction. Zoar was spared at Lot's plea and became his place of refuge, although later, he and his daughters moved away from Zoar into the hills.

A Zoar is mentioned in Isaiah 15:5 in connection with the nation of Moab. This connection with Moab would be consistent with a location near the lower Dead Sea plain.

== Historical city in extra-biblical sources ==
=== Roman period ===
Zoara is mentioned in the 1st century CE by Josephus and in the 2nd by Ptolemy (Geography V, xvi, 4).

=== Byzantine period ===
In the 4th century it is again mentioned by Eusebius in his Onomasticon, and in the 5th by Saint Jerome in his annotated version of the work.

Egeria the pilgrim tells of a bishop of Zoara who accompanied her in the area, in the early 380s. In the 6th century, the anonymous pilgrim of Piacenza describes its monks and extols its palm trees.

Zoara is mentioned in Tractate Pesachim of the Babylonian Talmud (3rd–6th century) as a place where date palms grew. In Tractate Yevamot, the city is mentioned in regards to a woman's testimony, when a traveling Levite died at an inn, and the woman innkeeper had him buried.

The Notitia Dignitatum, 72, probably reflecting the reality of the late 4th century, places at Zoara, as a garrison, the resident equites sagitarii indigenae (native unit of cavalry archers); Stephen of Byzantium (fl. 6th century; De urbibus, s.v. Addana) speaks also of its fort, which is mentioned in a Byzantine edit of the 5th century (Revue biblique, 1909, 99); near the city was a sanctuary to Saint Lot mentioned by Hierocles (6th century; Synecdemus) and George of Cyprus (early 7th century).

In the sixth-century Madaba Map, it is represented in the midst of a grove of palm trees under the names of Balac or Segor.

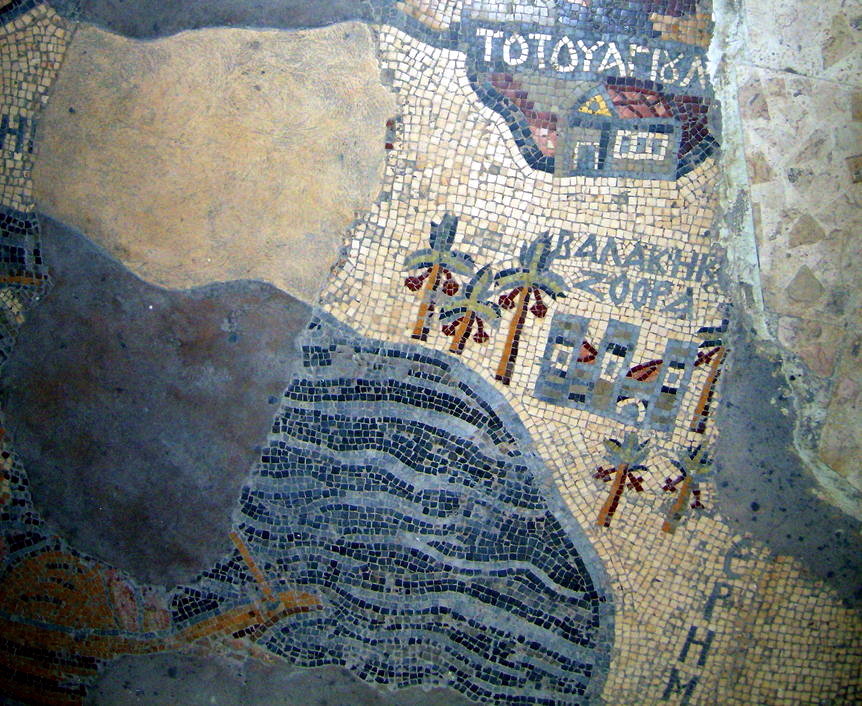
Zoar on the Madaba map

=== Early Muslim period ===
Istakhri and ibn Hawqal, two Muslim geographers of the 10th century, highly praise the sweetness of Zughar's dates, but are less impressed by the quality of the indigo produced there.

=== Crusader period ===
During the Crusader period it took the name of Palmer or Paumier. William of Tyre (XXII, 30) and Fulcher of Chartres (Hist. hierosol., V) have left descriptions of it.

The Syriac Chronicles of Patriarch Michael the Syrian (12th century) and of Bar Hebraeus (13th century; part up to his own time based on Michael) contain some obscure traditions regarding the founding of some of the "cities of the plain". According to these accounts, during the lifetime of Nahor (Abraham's grandfather), a certain Armonius the Canaanite had two sons named Sodom and Gomorrah, for whom he named two newly built towns, naming a third, Zoar, after their mother.

=== Mamluk period ===
According to the 14th-century travelogue The Travels of Sir John Mandeville

Zoar, by the prayer of Lot, was saved and kept a great while, for it was set upon a hill; and yet sheweth thereof some part above the water, and men may see the walls when it is fair weather and clear.

It is not known when the city disappeared.

== Christianity ==
Zoara was part of the late Roman province of Palaestina Tertia. It became a bishopric and is included in the Catholic Church's list of titular sees.

=== Historic bishopric ===
Michel Le Quien gives the names of three of its bishops:

- Musonius, present at the Second Council of Ephesus (449) and the Council of Chalcedon (451);
- Isidore, mentioned in 518 when Isidore signed the synodal letter of Patriarch John of Jerusalem against Severus of Antioch.
- John, in 536 signed the acts of the synod of Jerusalem convoked by Patriarch Peter against Antime of Constantinople and saw the bishops of the Three Palestines together. In the same year, in May, John also took part in the Synod of Constantinople by Patriarch Mena to condemn Antimo.

An anonymous bishop is mentioned in the Itinera hierosolymitana at the end of the fourth century (Vailhé).

=== Catholic titular see ===
The Roman Catholic Church recognizes the Diocese of Zoara (in Latin: Dioecesis Zoarensis) as a suppressed and titular see, although the seat has been vacant since August 25, 2001. Past Catholic bishops include:

- Francesco Maria Cutroneo (March 15, 1773 – November 1780)
- José Nicolau de Azevedo Coutinho Gentil (July 18, 1783 – 1807)
- Jean-Henri Baldus (March 2, 1844 – September 29, 1869)
- Claude-Thierry Obré (December 14, 1877 – December 14, 1881)
- Pedro José Sánchez Carrascosa y Carrión (March 30, 1882 – 1896)
- Patrick Vincent Dwyer (January 30, 1897 – July 9, 1909)
- René-Marie-Joseph Perros, (September 17, 1909 – November 27, 1952)
- Antonio Capdevilla Ferrando (March 24, 1953 – August 12, 1962)
- Wacław Skomorucha (November 21, 1962 – August 25, 2001)

== Archaeology ==
=== Locating Zoara: sources ===
Prior to the major archaeological excavations in the 1980s and 1990s that took place in Zoara, scholars proposed that several sites in the area of Khirbet Sheikh 'Isa and al-Naq' offered further evidence of Zoara's location and history. Further information regarding Zoara in different historical epochs was obtained through the descriptions of Arabian geographers, suggesting that Zoara served as an important station on the Aqaba-to-Jericho trade route, and through Eusebius' statement that the Dead Sea was situated between Zoar and Jericho. Researchers who have studied ancient texts portray Zoara as a town erected in the middle of a flourishing oasis, watered by rivers flowing down from the high Moab Mountains in the east. The sweet dates that grew abundantly on the palm trees surrounding Zoara are also mentioned in some historical texts.

=== Surveys and digs (1986–1996) ===
Several excavation surveys have been conducted in this area in the years 1986–1996.

==== Sanctuary of Saint Lot ====
Ruins of a basilical church that were discovered in the site of Deir 'Ain 'Abata ("Monastery at the Abata Spring" in Arabic), were identified as the Sanctuary of Agios (Saint) Lot. An adjacent cave is ascribed as the location where Lot and his daughters took refuge during the destruction of Sodom.

==== Mixed Christian-Jewish cemetery ====
About 300 engraved funerary steles in the Khirbet Sheikh 'Isa area in Ghor es-Safi were found in 1995. Most gravestones were inscribed in Greek and thus attributed to Christian burials, while several stones were inscribed in Aramaic, suggesting that they belong to Jewish burials. Of these, two inscriptions reveal the origins of the deceased as being Jews that hailed from Ḥimyar (now Yemen) and are funerary inscriptions dating back to 470 and 477 CE; these inscriptions are multilingual and written in the combined Hebrew, Aramaic and Ancient South Arabian scripts, the latter as employed for the Sabaean language. In one of them it was noted that the deceased was brought from Ẓafār, the capital of the Kingdom of Ḥimyar, to be buried in Zoar. These gravestones have all been traced back to the fourth-fifth centuries, when Zoara was an important Jewish center. Unusually, Christians and Jews were buried in the same cemetery.

== See also ==
- "Cities of the plain"
  - Admah – one of the five "cities of the plain"
  - Sodom and Gomorrah – two of the five "cities of the plain"
  - Zeboim – one of the five "cities of the plain"
- Museum at the Lowest Place on Earth
- Transjordan (region), biblical term (via Vulgate) for territories east of the Jordan Valley-Dead Sea line
- Zoar Valley in the state of New York, named after Zoara.

== Bibliography ==
- Politis, Konstantinos D. (2020). Ancient Landscapes of Zoara I: Surveys and Excavations at the Ghor as-Safi in Jordan, 1997–2018. Routledge. ISBN 978-1-000-22229-6.
