= Lot's wife =

Person mentioned in the biblical Book of Genesis

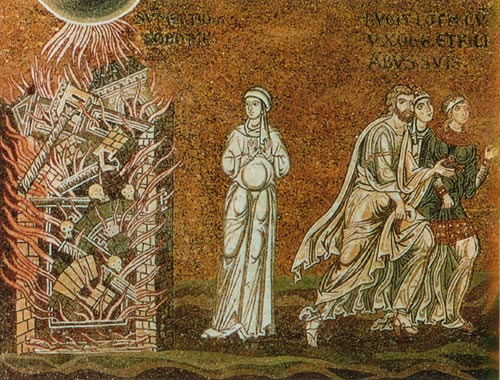
- For disobeying God by watching Sodom's destruction, Lot’s wife is turned into a "pillar of salt" while Lot and his daughters escape (Monreale Cathedral mosaic)

In-universe information
- Alias: Ado
- Spouse: Lot
- Children: 2 daughters
- Birth place: Ur Kaśdim
- Death place: Sodom

In the Bible, Lot's wife is a figure first mentioned in Genesis 19. The Book of Genesis describes how she became a pillar of salt after she looked back at Sodom during its destruction by God. She is not named in the Bible, but is called Ado or Edith in some Jewish traditions. She is also referred to in the deuterocanonical books at the Book of Wisdom (Wisdom 10:7) and the New Testament at Luke 17:32.

== Genesis narrative ==
The story of Lot's wife begins in Genesis 19 after two angels arrived in Sodom at eventide and were invited to spend the night at Lot's home. The men of Sodom were exceedingly wicked and prompted Lot to offer up these "strangers" to have sex with; instead, Lot offered up his two daughters but they were refused. As dawn was breaking, Lot's visiting angels urged him to get his family and flee, so as to avoid being caught in the impending disaster for the iniquity of the city. The command was given, "Flee for your life! Do not look behind you, nor stop anywhere in the Plain; flee to the hills, lest you be swept away." While fleeing, Lot's wife looked behind her at Sodom and was turned into a pillar of salt.

== Composition ==
The Hebrew verb used for Lot's wife "looking" back is מַבָּט (nāḇeṭ). Her looking back at Sodom differs in word usage from Abraham "looking" (שיקף šāqap) toward Sodom in Genesis 18:16.

== Pillar of salt ==
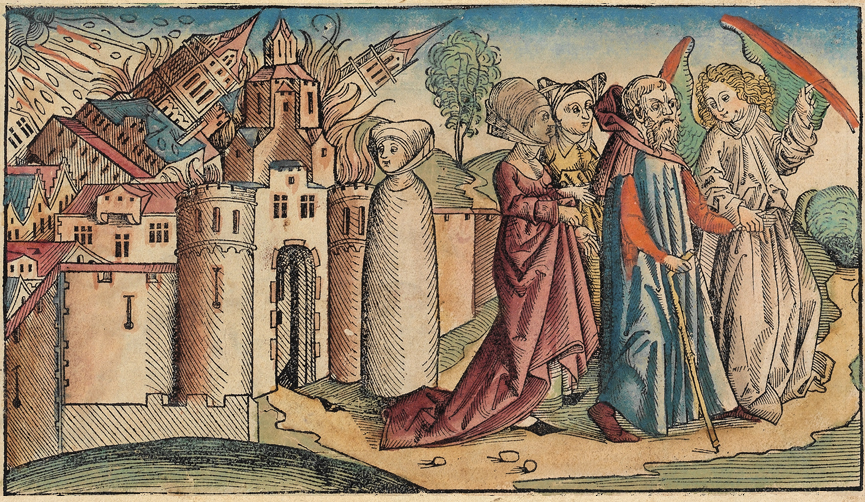
Lot's wife (center) turned into a pillar of salt during Sodom's destruction (Nuremberg Chronicle, 1493).

The story appears to be based in part on a folk legend explaining a geographic feature.

A pillar of salt named "Lot's wife" is located near the Dead Sea at Mount Sodom in Israel. Geologically, the salt pillar traditionally identified as "Lot's wife" is part of Mount Sodom, a salt diapir near the Dead Sea. A 2009 study by geologist Amos Frumkin analyzed a 20-meter-high salt pillar at Mount Sodom and concluded that its form was not created solely by direct rainfall erosion, but was related to the collapse of a karstic salt cave within the actively rising Sodom diapir. Modern travel descriptions of the site commonly describe the formation as a natural salt and mineral column on Mount Sodom, visible near the southern Dead Sea basin. A second one is shown to tourists across the Dead Sea, in Jordan, not far from the ruins of the Byzantine Monastery of St Lot.

The Talmud states that a blessing should be said at the place where the pillar of salt is. The term "Lot's wife" for such geographical features subsequently entered common parlance, as one of the outcrops comprising Long Ya Men was also nicknamed thus.

The Jewish historian Josephus claimed to have seen the pillar of salt which was Lot's wife. Its existence is also attested to by the early church fathers Clement of Rome and Irenaeus.

== Jewish commentaries ==
In Judaism, one common view of Lot's wife turning to salt was as punishment for disobeying the angels' warning. Josephus has her "continually" looking back. By looking back at the "evil cities", she conceded to her deep-seated longing for that way of life, and as such was deemed unworthy to be saved and thus was turned to a pillar of salt.

Another view in the Jewish exegesis of Genesis 19:26, is that when Lot's wife looked back, she turned to a pillar of salt upon the "sight of God" descending to rain destruction upon Sodom and Gomorrah. One reason given in the tradition is that she looked behind her to see if her daughters, married to men of Sodom, were coming or not.

Another Jewish legend says that because Lot's wife sinned with salt, she was punished with salt. On the night the two angels visited Lot, he requested that his wife prepare a feast for them. Not having any salt, Lot's wife asked her neighbors for some, which alerted them to the presence of their guests, resulting in the mob action that endangered Lot's family.

In the Midrash, Lot's wife's name is given as Ado or Edith.

== Islamic view ==
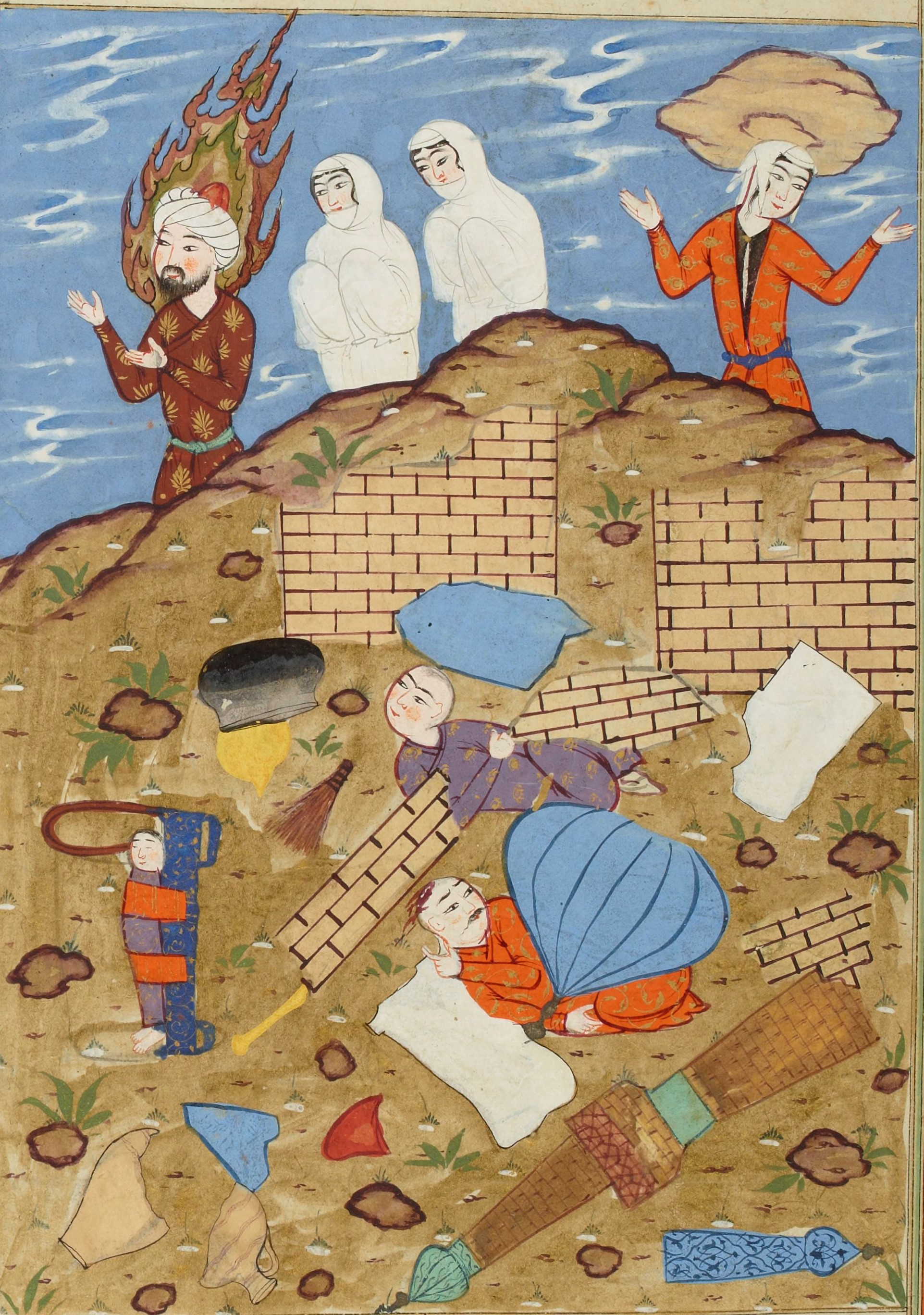
Lut fleeing the city with his daughters; his wife is killed by a rock.

Lut (Arabic: لوط, romanized: Lūṭ) in the Quran is considered to be the same as Lot in the Hebrew Bible. He is considered to be a messenger of God and a prophet of God.

In the Quranic telling, Lut warned his people of their imminent destruction lest they change their wicked ways, but they refused to listen to him. Lut was ordered by Allah to flee the city with his followers at night, but to leave his wife behind. As soon as he left, Allah brought down upon them a shower of stones of clay.

The difference between this telling and the Judeo-Christian telling from the Book of Genesis is that Lut's wife was destroyed alongside the wicked; in other words, she did not flee with Lut. This is because Lut's wife was as guilty as those who were punished. So much so, that she is mentioned in the Quran alongside Nuh's wife as two impious and disbelieving women who were punished for their wickedness, irrespective of their being married to prophets.

In the Quran, surah (chapter) 26 Ash-Shu'ara (The Poets) –

So We saved him and his family, all, Except an old woman among those who remained behind.

— Quran 26:170-171

Commentary: This was his wife, who was a bad old woman. She stayed behind and was destroyed with whoever else was left. This is similar to what Allah says about them in Surat Al-A`raf and Surah Hud, and in Surat Al-Hijr, where Allah commanded him to take his family at night, except for his wife, and not to turn around when they heard the Sayhah as it came upon his people. So they patiently obeyed the command of Allah and persevered, and Allah sent upon the people a punishment which struck them all, and rained upon them stones of baked clay, piled up.

— Tafsir Ibn Kathir 26:170-171

== Other biblical references ==
Lot's wife is mentioned by Jesus at Luke 17:32 in the context of warning his disciples about difficult times in the future when the Son of Man would return; he told them to remember Lot's wife as a warning to not waver at that time. Lot's wife is also referred to in the apocrypha in Wisdom 10:7 - "a pillar of salt standing as a monument to an unbelieving soul."

== Popular culture ==
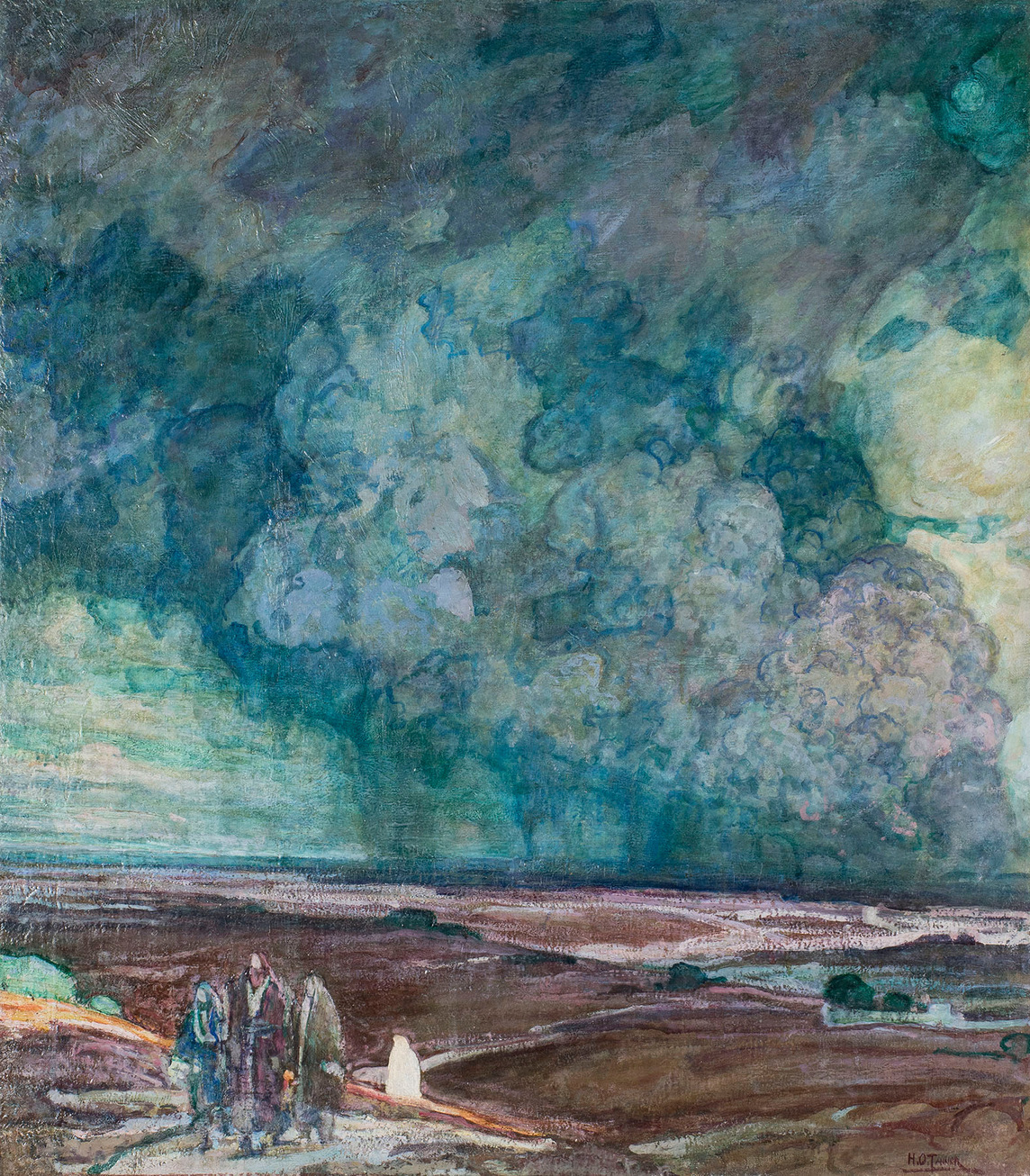
The transformation of Lot's wife is visible in the painting Sodom and Gomorrha by Henry Ossawa Tanner.

The poem, "Lot's Wife" by Anna Akhmatova, offers a more compassionate approach to Lot's wife's decision to look behind her. Scott Cairns' poem, "The Turning of Lot's Wife", also reimagines the story from a feminist perspective. In the first chapter of Slaughterhouse-Five by Kurt Vonnegut, the author praises Lot's wife for looking back knowing it would destroy her. Vonnegut compares her looking at Sodom to his recalling the fire bombing of Dresden.

The story of Lot's wife is paralleled in Shirley Jackson's short story "Pillar of Salt", in which a woman visiting New York with her husband becomes obsessed with the crumbling of the city.

A short story by Robert Edmond titled "She Fell Among Thieves" was published in Argosy (magazine) in 1964. It tells how a white statue of a fleeing woman was found on a dig near the Jordanian border by a group of archeological thieves who later discover that their purloined treasure disappears during their rainy truck ride to the border.

The musical Caroline, or Change features a climactic aria titled "Lot's Wife," which Tonya Pinkins performed at the 58th Tony Awards to represent the original Broadway production's Best Musical nomination. The song alludes to the story of Lot's wife as a release from the evil and heartache of life.

The book Pillars of Salt by Jordanian author Fadia Faqir uses the story as a metaphor for the experiences of the central characters, who spend the story recounting their lives as Bedouin women in British Mandate Jordan.

The poem "Looking Back" by Ursula K. Le Guin in her poetry anthology So Far So Good: Final Poems 2014–2018 references this story from the perspective of Lot's wife in the lines "Remember me before I was a heap of salt" and "the merry girl who became Lot’s bride, / the happy woman who loved her wicked city".

== Gallery ==
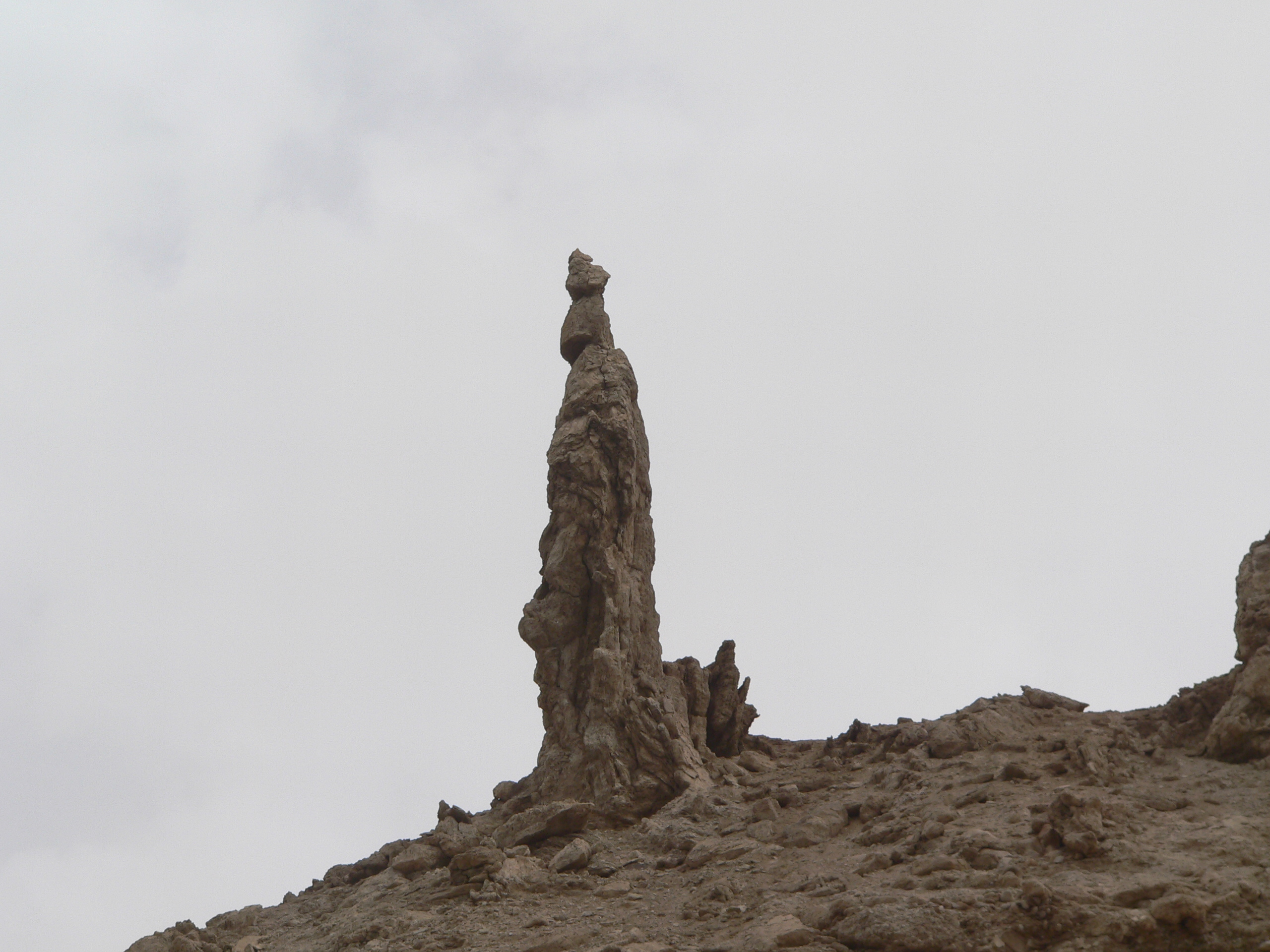
A rock formation near the Monastery of St Lot venerated as Lot's wife as a pillar of salt

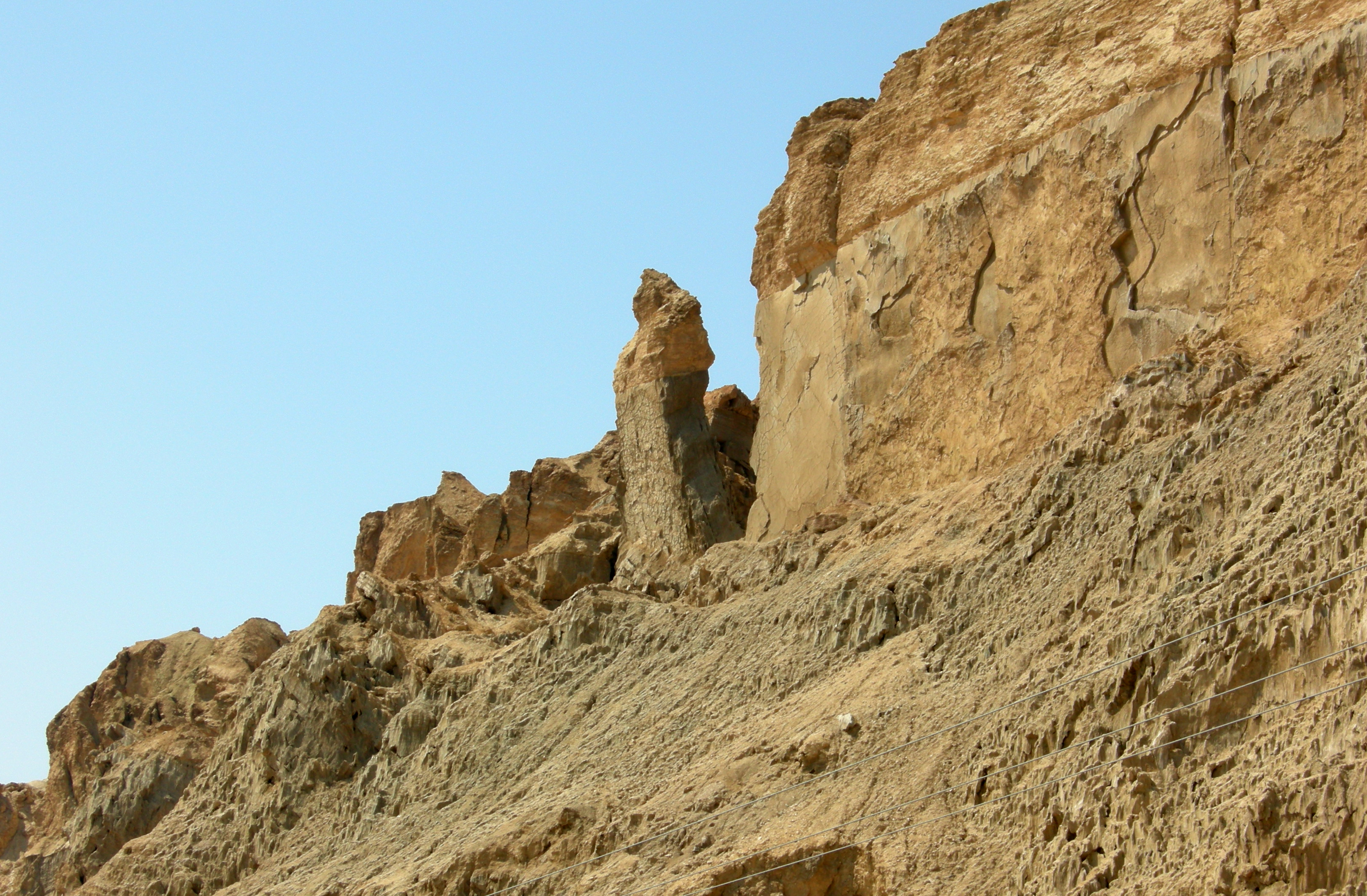
"Lot's Wife" pillar of salt, Mount Sodom, Israel.

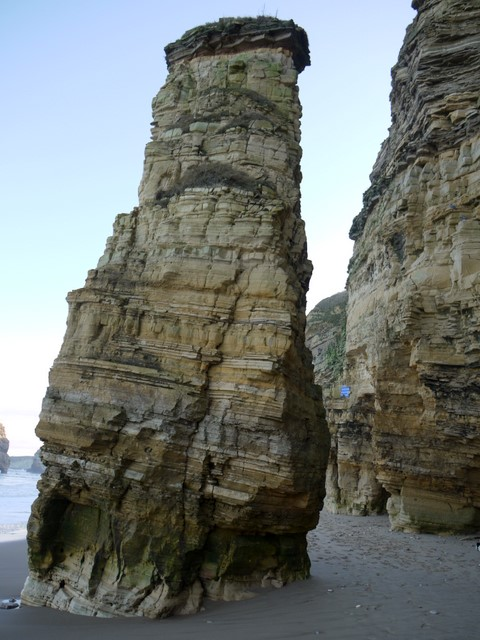
The 'Lot's wife' sea-stack, Marsden Bay, South Shields, North East England, United Kingdom located on the North Sea coast

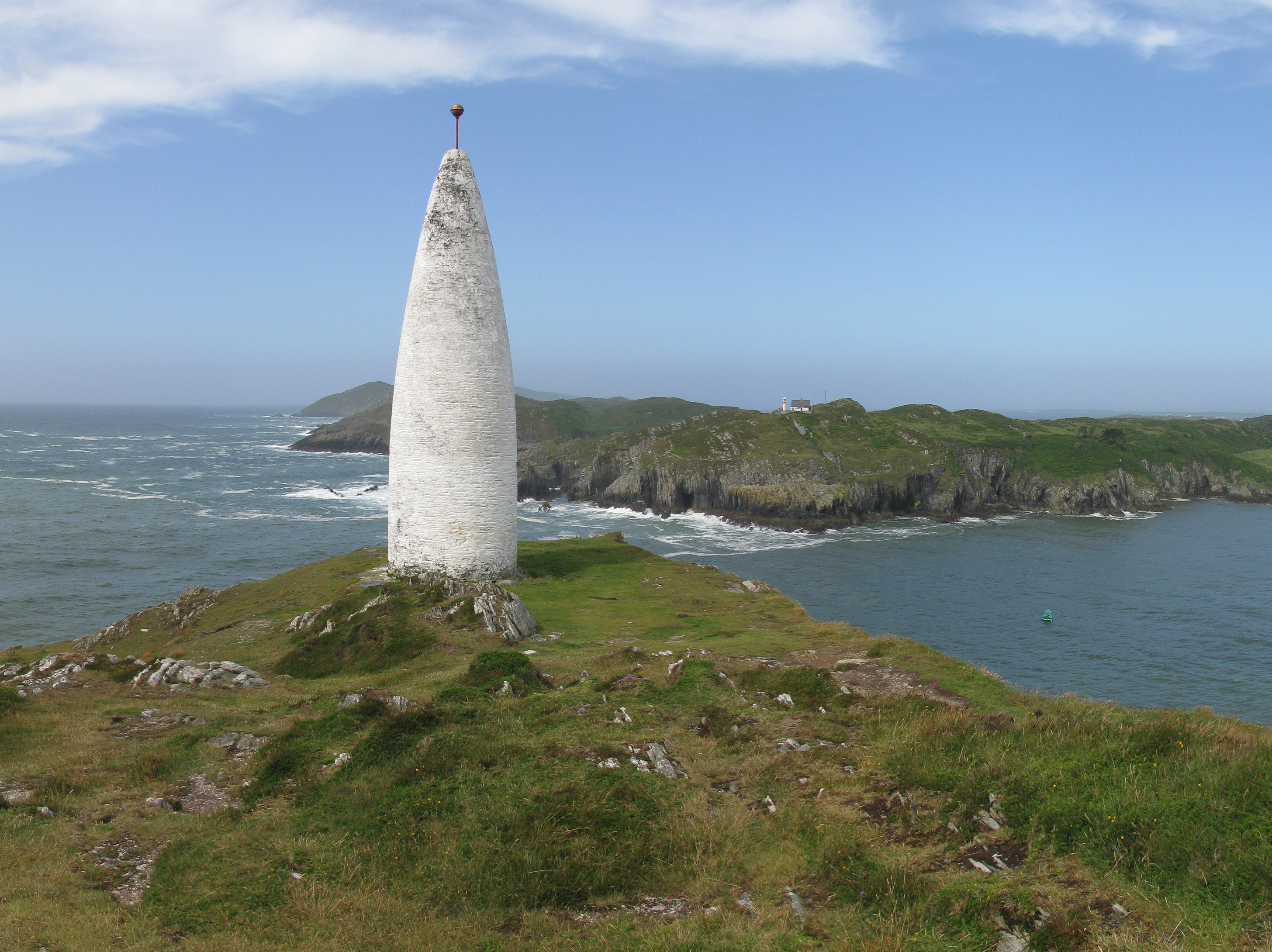
The conspicuous conical white painted beacon at Baltimore, Ireland is locally nicknamed The Pillar of Salt or Lot's wife

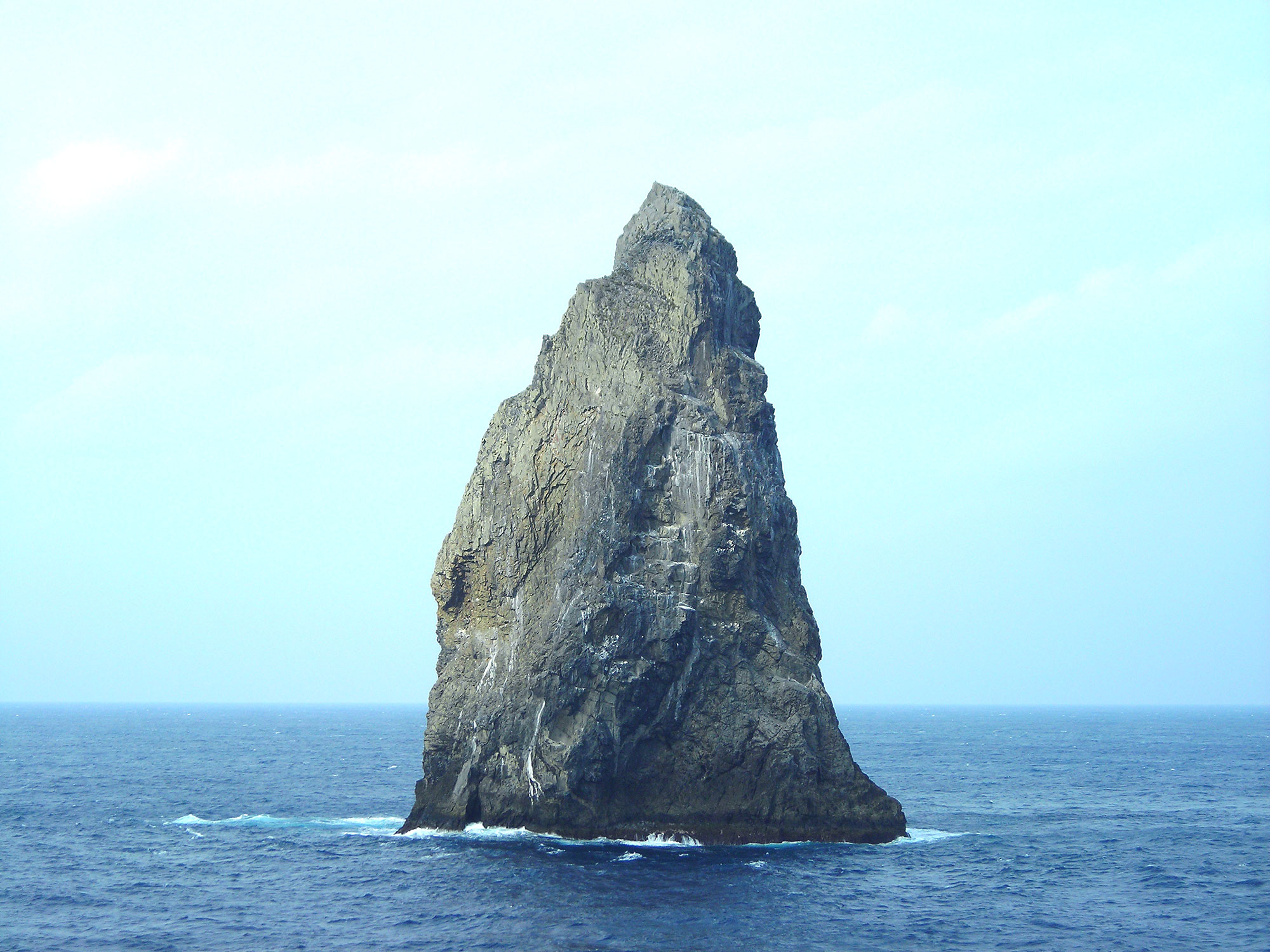
Lot's Wife is a volcanic, deserted island at the southernmost tip of the Izu archipelago, Japan.

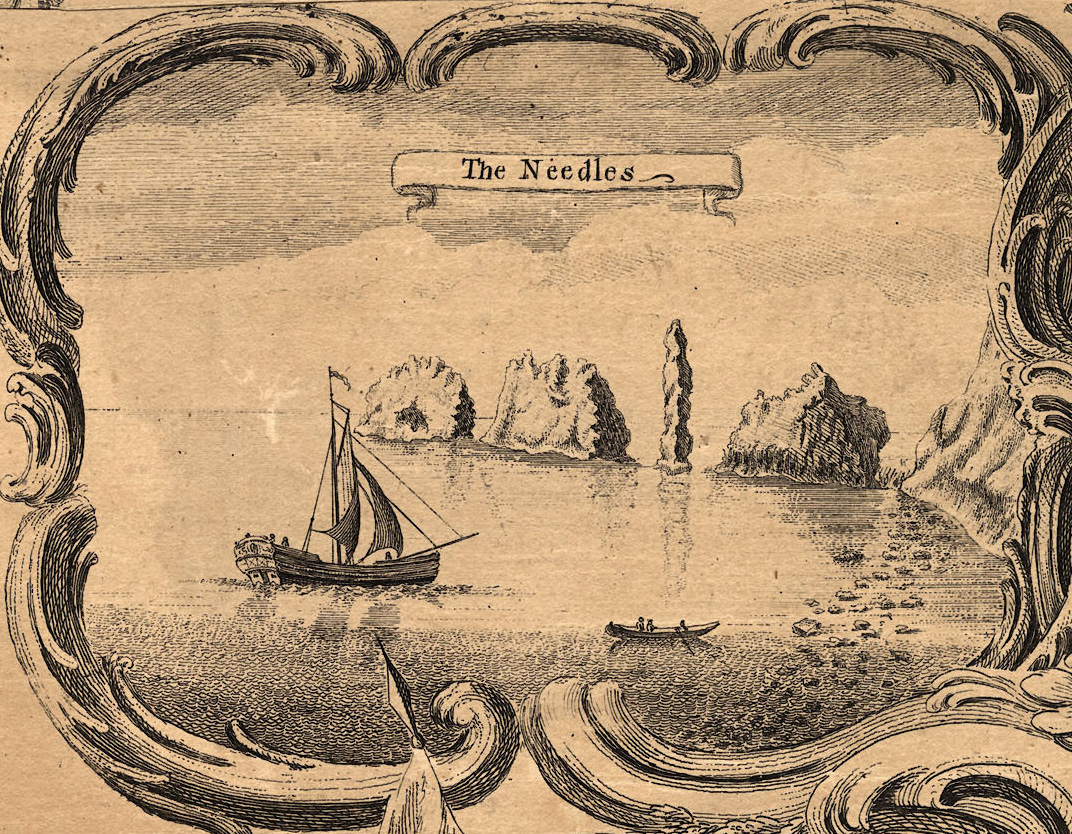
The Needles from Isaac Taylor's "one inch map" of Hampshire, published in 1759, showing Lot's Wife, the needle-shaped pillar that collapsed in a storm in 1764

== See also ==
- Baucis and Philemon
- Kiidk'yaas
- List of names for the biblical nameless
- Lot's Wife (crag)
- Niobe
- Orpheus
- The Needles
- Vayeira
