= Konstantinos Politis (archaeologist) =

Greek archaeologist (1958–2026)

Konstantinos Demetris Politis
- Politis examining archaeological material in a conservation laboratory, 2016
- Born: 18 November 1958; Kozani, Greece
- Died: 11 August 2026 (aged 67)
- Other name: Dino Politis
- Education: George Washington University; College of Europe; Institute of Archaeology, University of London; University of Ioannina
- Known for: Excavations at the Sanctuary of Lot and ancient Zoara; Museum at the Lowest Place on Earth
- Scientific career
- Fields: Archaeology, Byzantine archaeology, Islamic archaeology, cultural heritage
- Workplaces: British Museum; American Center of Research; Hellenic Society for Near Eastern Studies

Konstantinos Demetris Politis (18 November 1958 – 11 August 2026), commonly known as Dino Politis, was a Greek archaeologist whose research focused on the archaeology and cultural heritage of the Near East, particularly Jordan and the southeastern Dead Sea region. A specialist in the Byzantine and early Islamic periods, he directed long-term archaeological work at the Sanctuary of Lot at Deir 'Ain 'Abata and ancient Zoara at Ghor as-Safi. He was also closely involved in establishing the Museum at the Lowest Place on Earth in Jordan.

== Early life and education ==
Politis was born in Kozani, Greece, on 18 November 1958. His father, Demetris Politis, was an officer in the Greek army, and his mother, Christine Biller, was a schoolteacher. He was educated in Greece, the United States, Belgium and the United Kingdom. He received a bachelor's degree in international affairs and anthropology from George Washington University in 1980, completed a master's degree in public administration at the College of Europe in Bruges, and earned a master's degree in archaeology from the Institute of Archaeology, University of London, in 1984. He received his PhD in archaeology from the University of Ioannina in 2004.

== Archaeological career ==
=== Early work and the British Museum ===
Politis first undertook archaeological fieldwork in Jordan in 1984 at Tell Umm Hammad esh-Sharqiya in the Jordan Valley, working with Alison Betts and Svend Helms. In 1985 he joined the British Museum excavations at Tell es-Sa'idiyeh, directed by Jonathan Tubb.

In 1988, Politis joined the British Museum as a special assistant in the department then known as Medieval and Later Antiquities. The museum supported his early archaeological projects in Jordan. He remained associated with the British Museum until 2006 and also worked on its excavations at Ra's al-Hadd in Oman.

=== Sanctuary of Lot ===
One of Politis's principal projects was the investigation of the Sanctuary of Lot at Deir 'Ain 'Abata, southeast of the Dead Sea. He excavated the site over seven seasons between 1988 and 1996. The complex had been identified as corresponding to a sanctuary depicted on the sixth-century Madaba Map.

The excavations uncovered a Byzantine basilica constructed in front of a natural cave that early Christians associated with the biblical account of Lot. The site contained mosaic pavements dating from the sixth and seventh centuries CE and evidence of human activity extending back to the Early Bronze Age. A communal burial discovered in a disused cistern contributed to interpretations of the site's monastic community and its possible role as a hospice.

Politis continued conserving and studying the sanctuary after the excavations. The results were published in the monograph Excavations of the Sanctuary of Lot at Deir 'Ain 'Abata in Jordan, 1988–2003.

=== Zoara and Ghor as-Safi ===
From 1997, Politis directed research in the region of Ghor as-Safi, identified with ancient Zoara. The multidisciplinary project examined the area's settlement history and landscape from prehistory through the Islamic period. It included archaeological survey and excavation, the study of cemeteries and inscriptions, architectural and environmental research, and investigation of the region's historic economy.

His work included excavation of Byzantine and Islamic levels at Khirbet esh-Shaykh 'Isa and investigation of the medieval sugar-production complex at Tawahin as-Sukkar. The sugar factory reached its greatest production during the Crusader and Mamluk periods. Research into the area's earlier cultivation of indigo also contributed to a UNESCO-supported community project with the Safi Women's Association to revive indigo cultivation and textile dyeing.

The results of the regional research were published in the multi-volume Ancient Landscapes of Zoara series, which brought together archaeological, historical, environmental, architectural and material-culture studies.

=== Other archaeological and heritage projects ===
In 1996, Politis intervened after looting and construction activity exposed burials at the Nabataean and Roman-period cemetery of Khirbet Qazone near the Dead Sea. He subsequently directed salvage and documentation work at the cemetery, where the arid and saline conditions had preserved textiles and some human remains.

Outside Jordan, Politis participated in archaeological work at Ra's al-Hadd in Oman and served as assistant director of the British Museum excavations there from 1998 to 2006. From 2004 to 2009, he participated in a programme documenting mosaic pavements in Syria and contributed to an exhibition on Hellenistic Syria at the Hama Museum. From 2021, he co-directed the Hinterland of Medieval Chalkida Project in Greece.

== Museum and heritage conservation ==
Politis played a central role in the development of the Museum at the Lowest Place on Earth at Ghor as-Safi, which opened in 2012. The museum presents archaeological discoveries and the cultural history of the southeastern Dead Sea region and includes a conservation laboratory and archaeological storage facilities.

Politis at the Museum at the Lowest Place on Earth in Ghor as-Safi, Jordan.

He worked with Jordanian authorities, international organisations and local communities on the conservation of mosaics, archaeological buildings and artefacts. Through projects supported by the American Center of Research and USAID, he also contributed to local training in site management, conservation and cultural-heritage tourism.

== Academic and professional affiliations ==
Politis was a co-founder and chairman of the Hellenic Society for Near Eastern Studies. He held research fellowships in Jordan, Australia and the United States and was awarded an ACOR–CAORC postdoctoral fellowship for 2024–2025. He collaborated with Greek universities, including the Ionian University, where he undertook postdoctoral research and worked with the Museology Research Laboratory.

He authored or edited approximately 100 scholarly articles and several books on the archaeology of Jordan, Byzantine and Islamic sites, ancient inscriptions, the Nabataeans and the historical development of Zoara.

== Selected publications ==
- Politis, Konstantinos D., ed. (2007). The World of the Nabataeans. Oriens et Occidens. Vol. 15. Franz Steiner Verlag. ISBN 978-3-515-08816-9.
- Politis, Konstantinos D. (2008). Excavations of the Sanctuary of Lot at Deir 'Ain 'Abata in Jordan, 1988–2003. British Museum.
- Politis, Konstantinos D. (2020). Zoara, the Southern Ghor of Jordan: A Guide to the Landscape and Heritage of the Lowest Place on Earth. American Center of Research.
- Politis, Konstantinos D., ed. (2021). Ancient Landscapes of Zoara I: Surveys and Excavations at the Ghor as-Safi in Jordan, 1997–2018. Routledge. ISBN 978-1-003-10869-6.
- Politis, Konstantinos D., ed. (2022). Ancient Landscapes of Zoara II: Finds from Surveys and Excavations at the Ghor as-Safi in Jordan, 1997–2018. Routledge. ISBN 978-1-032-35965-6.

== Death and legacy ==
Politis died on 11 August 2026, aged 67, following a series of strokes. Obituaries and retrospective assessments appeared in The Guardian, Biblical Archaeology Review and The Jordan Times, which highlighted his archaeological research, conservation work and long relationship with communities in Jordan.

His research documented the archaeology and cultural history of the southeastern Dead Sea region, while his museum and conservation work contributed to preserving archaeological sites and keeping finds close to the communities and landscapes in which they were discovered.
