= Monastery of St Lot =

Byzantine-period monastic site

Coordinates: 31.0468°N 35.5027°E

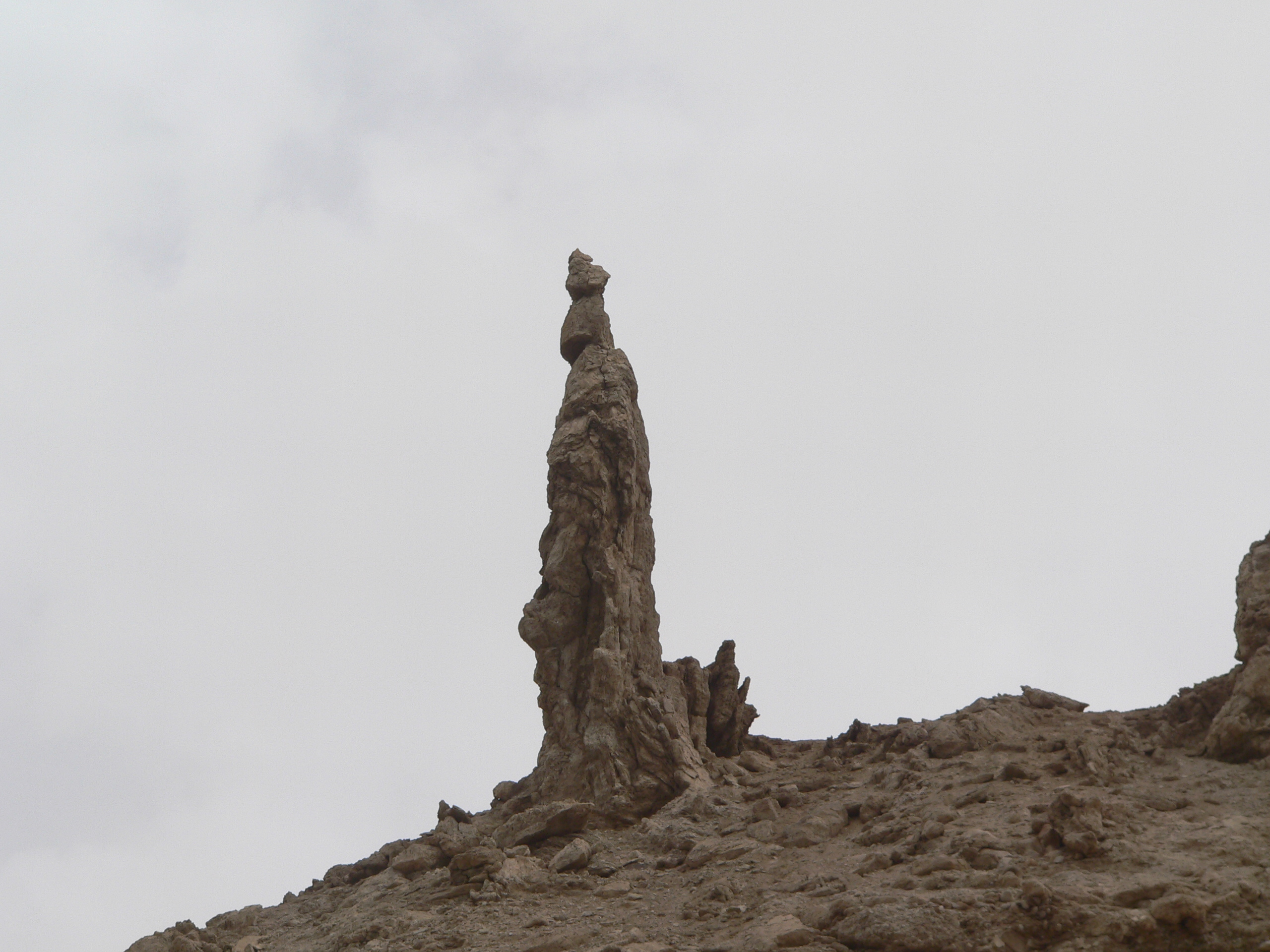
A rock formation nearby venerated as Lot's wife as a pillar of salt

The Monastery of St Lot (Τὸ τοῦ ἁγίου Λωτ) is a Byzantine-period monastic site near the Dead Sea in Jordan, at the entrance to a natural cave, which Catholics believed to have been the one where Lot and his daughters sought shelter after Sodom was destroyed (Genesis 19:24–25). The monastery, dating to the 5th-7th centuries, is centered around a basilical church and overlooks from a steep slope the southeastern Dead Sea and the modern town of Safi in Jordan.

== History and archaeology ==
Archaeological finds reveal a long-term settlement regime for the cave the sanctuary is built around. The oldest material found inside the cave suggests a sizable Early and Middle Bronze Age presence, followed by Nabataean pottery, which is indicative of a settlement there during the first centuries BC and AD.

However, the bulk of the findings are associated with the church and monastery and date to the early Byzantine period (c. 5th-7th centuries). Two inscriptions on the church's mosaic floor bear dates from the 7th century: construction in April 606, and a renovation in Xanthikos (roughly May) 691. Habitation only ceased after the Early Abbasid period (late 8th to early 9th centuries), which is interpreted to show that both Christians and Muslims still venerated St Lot at the site throughout this time.

The monastery had a large basilical church 18 x 17 meters long, a reservoir, a hostel complex, and access to a wide range of foods including fruits, meats, and fish from the Red Sea.

=== Tombs ===
A communal tomb in a disused cistern, cave burials, and single stone-lined burials account for monks and pilgrims; at least one burial was of African origin, corroborating the presence of Coptic coins and pottery.

=== Onomasticon of officials and pilgrims ===
Greek mosaic inscriptions name church officials including Bishop Iakovos, Abbot Sozomenos, Presbyter and County Bishop Christoforos, Presbyter and Oeconomos Zenos, Governor Ioannis son of Ravivos, Georgios the sacristan, and builders Ioannis Prokopios and Ioannis Savinou. Pilgrim graffiti includes names such as Nestacia Zenobia, Ulpius, Sozomenos, and Pavlos.

== World Heritage status ==
This site was added to the UNESCO World Heritage Tentative List on June 18, 2001 in the Cultural category.

== Bibliography ==
- The Sanctuary of Agios Lot, At Deir 'Ain 'Abata - UNESCO World Heritage Centre Accessed 2009-02-27.
- Negev, Avraham; Gibson, Shimon, eds. (2001). "Deir Ain Abata". Archaeological Encyclopedia of the Holy Land. New York and London: Continuum. pp. 137–138. ISBN 0-8264-1316-1. (Snippet view).

== See also ==
- Ghor es-Safi, area along the Dead Sea at the foot of the slope with Lot's Cave
