= List of minor Hebrew Bible figures, A–K =

This article contains persons named in the Bible, specifically in the Hebrew Bible, of minor notability, about whom little or nothing is known, aside from some family connections. Here are the names which start with A-K.

== A ==
=== Abdiel ===
Abdiel (Hebrew: עַבְדִּיאֵל, lit. 'servant [of] God') was the son of Guni and the father of Ahi, according to 1 Chronicles 5:15. He came from the tribe of Gad, lived in Gilead or Bashan, and was reckoned in genealogies of the time of Jotham, king of Judah, or of Jeroboam II, king of Israel.

=== Abi ===
See Abijah

=== Abiah ===
See Abijah

=== Abialbon ===
See Abiel

=== Abiasaph ===
Abiasaph (Hebrew: אֲבִיאָסָף, lit. 'my father has gathered') was a son of Korah of the tribe of Levi, according to Exodus 6:24, and born in Egypt. Ebiasaph is a spelling variation of Abiasaph.

=== Abimael ===
In Genesis 10:28, Abimael (Hebrew אֲבִֽימָאֵ֖ל) is the ninth of the 13 sons of Joktan, a descendant of Shem. He is also mentioned in 1 Chronicles 1:22. Abimael means "God is a father."

=== Abinadab ===
Abinadab (Hebrew אֲבִינָדָב "my father apportions" or "the father [i.e. god of the clan] is munificent") refers to four biblical characters. Where the Hebrew text reads Avinadav, Greek manuscripts of the Septuagint read Am(e)inadab or Abin. but Brenton's translation of the Septuagint reads "Abinadab".

1. A man of Kiriath-Jearim, in whose house on a hill the Ark of the Covenant was deposited after having been brought back from the land of the Philistines. "It is most likely that this Abinadab was a Levite". The ark remained in his care for twenty years, guarded by his son Eleazar, until it was at length removed by David.
2. The second of the eight sons of Jesse. He was with Saul in the campaign against the Philistines in which Goliath was slain.
3. One of Saul's sons, who perished with his father in the battle of Gilboa.

=== Abishur ===
According to the Hebrew Bible, Abishur or Abishur ben Shammai (Hebrew אֲבִישׁוּר) was the spouse of Abihail, and the father of Molin and Ahban. He was directly from the tribe of Judah as the son of Shammai the son of Onam the great-great-grandson of Judah. (1 Chronicles 2:28–29)

=== Abitub ===
The name Abitub or Abitob (Hebrew אֲבִיטוּב) appears only once in the Hebrew Bible, in 1 Chronicles 8:11, where it is used for a character said to be the son of Shaharaim, in a section on the descendants of Benjamin.

=== Adalia ===
Mentioned only in Esther 9:8, Adalia (Hebrew אֲדַלְיָא) is the fifth of the Persian noble Haman's ten sons. Adalia was slain along with his nine siblings in Susa. In various manuscripts of the Septuagint, his name is given as Barsa, Barel, or Barea.

=== Adbeel ===
Adbeel (Hebrew אַדְבְּאֵל "disciplined by God"), also Nadbeel or Idiba'ilu, was the third of the twelve sons of Ishmael. The name Adbeel is a personal name and also associated with a northwestern tribe in Arabia known as Idiba'ilu, historically a border or "gatekeeper" tribe.

=== Addar ===
Addar (Hebrew אַדָּר), according to the Hebrew Bible, was the son of Bela the son of Benjamin the eponymous founder of the tribe of Benjamin. He is briefly mentioned in 1 Chronicles 8:3.

=== Ader ===
See Eder

=== Adeel ===
Adeel (Hebrew עֲדִיאֵל) may refer to 3 people:

1. The father of Azmaveth, who was treasurer under David and Solomon, mentioned only in 1 Chronicles 27:25.
2. A family head of the tribe of Simeon, who participated in driving out the Meunim, mentioned only in 1 Chronicles 4:36.
3. See Azareel

=== Adin ===
Adin (Hebrew עָדִין) was the head of a family who returned from Babylon with Zerubbabel in Ezra 2:15, 8:6. However, according to Nehemiah 7:20, his descendants were 655, that is, completely divergent from the descendants in Ezra as 454. He is also found in Nehemiah 10:17 as one who signed Nehemiah's covenant.

=== Adino ===
Adino (Hebrew עֲדִינוֹ) was an Eznite and one of David's mighty men found in 2 Samuel 23:8.. He is identified with Jashobeam and the name does not occur in other translations in the Bible. Ginsburg offers a corrected form taken substantially from the parallel passage in 1 Chronicles 11:11: "Jashobeam a son of a Hachmonite, chief of the captains; he lifted up his spear." This is plausible, and is very generally accepted, and eliminates the names Adino and Eznite, which do not occur elsewhere in the Bible. Some of the facts are against this. The Septuagint has the names Adino and Eznite. The Latin finds no proper names in the passage, but so translates the words as to presuppose the Hebrew text as we have it. It may be a case for suspended judgment.

=== Adlai ===
Adlai is in Hebrew עַדְלָי, meaning "refuge". In 1 Chronicles 27:29, he is the father of Shaphat. He is mentioned only in this verse.

=== Admatha ===
Admatha (Hebrew אַדְמָ֣תָא) is an advisor to Ahasuerus of Persia, mentioned only in Esther 1:14. According to one theory, the verse has suffered from scribal error, and as it originally stood Admatha was instead Hamdatha, not an adviser to Ahaseurus but the father of Haman.

=== Adna ===
Adna (Hebrew עַדְנָא) is the name of two biblical characters.

- One of the men of pahath-moav who took foreign wives.
- A priest, named as the head of the priestly family Harim in the time of Joiakim.

=== Adnah ===
Adnah is the name of at least two individuals in the Hebrew Bible.

1. Adnah (Hebrew עַדְנָה) is found in 2 Chronicles 17:14. He is called Ednaas or Ednas in Septuagint manuscripts, is credited with being a commander of 300,000 soldiers in the army of Jehoshaphat. His name is spelled with a final He, as opposed to Adna, above, whose named is spelled with an alef.
2. Adnah (Hebrew עַדְנַח) is found in 1 Chronicles 12:20. He is called Edna in the Septuagint, refers to a member of the Tribe of Manasseh who deserted Saul to support David. His name is spelled with either a final He or else a Heth, depending on the manuscript.

=== Adonijah ===
Adonijah (Hebrew אֲדֹנִיָּה, "My God YHVH") is the name of 2 minor biblical figures.

- A Levite sent by Jehoshaphat to teach in the cities of Judah in 2 Chronicles 17:8.
- A chief of the people. He sealed the covenant to keep God's Laws in the times of Nehemiah, found in Nehemiah 10:17.

=== Adonikam ===
Adonikam (Hebrew אֲדֹנִיקָם, meaning, "My Lord is risen up.") is a Biblical figure, one of those "which came with Zerubbabel" (Ezra 2:13). His "children," or retainers, numbering 666, came to Jerusalem (Ezra 8:13). In the Septuagint, depending on the manuscript and location, the name is given as Adon[e]ikam, Adonikan, Adeikam, Adenikam, Adaneikam or Adoniakaim. In Nehemiah 7:18, his descendants were 667 instead of the previous number 666.

=== Adriel ===
Adriel (Hebrew עַדְרִיאֵל) was the son of Barzillai the Meholathite, whom Saul gave in marriage his own daughter, Merab. The five sons that sprang from this union were put to death by the Gibeonites. (1 Samuel 18:19; 2 Samuel 21:8–9). Here it is said that Michal bore these five children; either that she treated them as if she had been their own mother, or that for "Michal" we should read "Merab," in 1 Samuel 18:19.

=== Agee ===
Agee (Hebrew אָגֵא) was the father of Shammah, who was one of David's mighty men (2 Samuel 23:11). Based on interpretations of 1 Chronicles 11:34 and 2 Samuel 23:32–33 Agee was either the grandfather of Jonathan or his brother. According to Cheyne and Black, his name is a scribal mistake, and should read "Ela"; he is the same as the Ela mentioned in 1 Kings 4:18.

=== Ahab ===
Ahab (Hebrew: אָחאַב, which means "brother/father") is the name of at least one minor biblical figure:

- Ahab, son of Koliah, who, according to Jeremiah 29:21, was labeled a false prophet by YHVH

=== Aharah ===
See Ehi

=== Aharhel ===
In 1 Chronicles 4:8, Aharhel (Hebrew אֲחַרְחֵל "behind the rampart") is the son of Harum of the tribe of Judah.

=== Ahasai ===
See Ahzai, and Meshullam

=== Ahasbai ===
Ahasbai (Hebrew אֲחַסְבַּי), the son of the Maachathite, was the father of Eliphelet, one of King David's Warriors (2 Samuel 23:34).

=== Ahaz ===
Ahaz (Hebrew אָחָז) was a son of Micah, and great-grandson of Jonathan. (1 Chronicles 8:35, 9:42)

=== Ahban ===
Ahban (Hebrew אַחְבָּן) was the first son of Abishur and Abihail. He was also the brother of Molid and a Jerahmeelite. He is mentioned in the following passage: 1 Chronicles 2:29.

=== Aher ===
Aher (Hebrew אַחֵר, translated as "other") was a Benjamite and the father of Hushim. (1 Chronicles 7:12) He might be the same as Ahiram and Aharah.

=== Ahi ===
(Hebrew אֲחִי "my brother")

- Ahi is the son of Abdiel in 1 Chronicles 5:15
- Ahi is the son of Shomer in 1 Chronicles 7:34

=== Ahiah ===
See Ahijah

=== Ahiam ===
Ahiam (Hebrew אֲחִיאָם) is one of David's thirty heroes. He was the son of Sharar (2 Samuel 23:33) or according to 1 Chronicles 11:35 of Sacar, the Hararite.

=== Ahian ===
Ahian (Hebrew אַחְיָן) is the name given to a descendant of Manasseh in the tribal genealogies of 1 Chronicles 7:19. The name appears only in a single time in the Bible.

=== Ahiezer ===
Ahiezer (Hebrew אֲחִיעֶזֶר) is the name of 2 biblical figures:

- The son of Ammishaddai was the leader of the tribe of Dan and one of the leaders of the tribes of Israel mentioned in several places in the Book of Numbers (Number 1:12, Numbers 2:25).
- One of David's mighty warriors which was chief of David's army; who joined him in war in Ziklag. He was the son of Shemaah. (1 Chronicles 12:3)

=== Ahihud ===
See Abihud

Ahihud is the name of 3 or 2 biblical individuals

1. Ahihud (Hebrew אֲחִיחֻד). A son of Ehud, of the tribe of Benjamin. He may be the same as the first but the text might be corrupt. (1 Chronicles 8:6-7)
2. Ahihud (Hebrew אֲחִיהוּד), meaning brother of Judah. Chief of the tribe of Asher; one of those appointed by Moses to superintend the division of Canaan among the tribe (Numbers 34:27)

=== Ahijah ===
Ahijah (Hebrew אֲחִיָּה "my brother is YHWH") is the name of 7 minor biblical individuals.

1. One of the sons of Ehud (1 Chr. 8:7).
2. One of the five sons of Jerahmeel, who was great-grandson of Judah (1 Chr. 2:25).
3. A Pelonite, one of David's heroes (1 Chr. 11:36); called also Eliam (2 Sam. 23:34).
4. A Levite having charge of the sacred treasury in the temple (1 Chr. 26:20).
5. One of Solomon's secretaries (1 Kings 4:3).
6. Son of Ahitub (1 Sam. 14:3-18), Ichabod's brother; the same probably as Ahimelech, who was High Priest at Nob in the reign of Saul (1 Sam. 22:11) and at Shiloh, where the Tabernacle was set up. Some, however, suppose that Ahimelech was the brother of Ahijah, and that they both officiated as high priests, Ahijah at Gibeah or Kirjath-jearim, and Ahimelech at Nob.
7. Father of King Baasha of Israel (1 Kings 15:27)

=== Ahikam ===
Ahikam (Hebrew אחיקם, "My brother has risen") was one of the five whom, according to the Hebrew Bible, Josiah sent to consult the prophetess Huldah in connection with the discovery of the book of the law.

=== Ahilud ===
Ahilud (Hebrew אֲחִילוּד) is the father of Jehoshaphat, who serves as court recorder to David (2 Samuel 8:16) and Solomon (1 Kings 4:3). In 1 Kings 4:12, Ahilud is the father of Baana, an official in Solomon's court sent to gather provisions in Taanach and Megiddo, and Beth Shan.

=== Ahimaaz ===
Ahimaaz (Hebrew אֲחִימָעַץ) was the name of 2 or 1 biblical individuals.

- The father of Ahinoam the wife of Saul. (1 Samuel 14:50)
- Ahimaaz, in Naphtali, was one of Solomon's twelve commissary officers and married Basemath, Solomon's daughter. (1 Kings 4:15) It is possible that he is Ahimaaz, Zadok's son.

=== Ahiman ===
Ahiman (אֲחִימַן) is the name of 2 biblical individuals.

- One of the three giant Anakim brothers whom Caleb and the spies saw in Mount Hebron (Numbers 13:22) when they went in to explore the land. They were afterwards driven out and slain (Joshua 15:14; Judges 1:10).
- One of the guardians of the temple after the exile. (1 Chronicles 9:17)

=== Ahimelech ===
Ahimelech the Hittite (אֲחִימֶלֶךְ הַחִתִּי "my brother is a king") is the name of 1 minor biblical individual which is referred in 1 Samuel 26:6 as a companion and friend of David, when he was hiding from Saul in the wilderness.

=== Ahimoth ===
See Mahath

=== Ahinadab ===
Ahinadab (Hebrew: אחינדב Akhinadav "my brother Is noble" or "my brother has devoted himself"), son of Iddo, is one of the twelve commissariat officers appointed by Solomon to districts of his kingdom to raise supplies by monthly rotation for his household. He was appointed to the district of Mahanaim (1 Kings 4:14), east of Jordan.

=== Ahinoam ===
There are two references in the Bible to people; who bear that name;

- A daughter of Ahimaaz; who became a wife of Saul and the mother of his four sons and two daughters, one of whom is Michal, David's first wife.
- A woman from Jezreel, who became David's second wife, after he fled from Saul, leaving Michal, his first wife, behind, and the mother of Amnon, David's first-born.

=== Ahio ===
Ahio (אַחְיוֹ "brotherly" or "fraternal") is the name of 3 biblical individuals.

- One of the sons of Beriah. (1 Chronicles 8:14)
- One of the sons of Jehiel the Giebeonite. (1 Chronicles 8:31, 9:37)
- One of the sons of Abinadab the Levite. He helped carried the Ark of the Covenant with Uzzah, his brother, out of his father's house. (1 Samuel 6:3–4; 1 Chronicles 13:7)

=== Ahira ===
Ahira (אֲחִירַע "my brother is evil") was the leader of the tribe of Naphtali mentioned in recording of the census, and was the "hereditary" prince of his tribe who made tribal sacrifices to Yahweh, and commander of his tribe in the march. (Numbers 1:15; 2:29; 7:78,83; 10:27)

=== Ahiram ===
Ahiram (אֲחִירָם) was a son of Benjamin according to Numbers 26:38.

=== Ahisamach ===
Ahisamach or Ahisamakh, also Ahis'amach (Hebrew: אחיסמך "brother of support"), of the tribe of Dan, was the father of Aholiab according to Exodus 31:6, Exodus 35:34, and Exodus 38:23.

=== Ahishahar ===
Ahishahar (אֲחִישַׁחַר "my brother is dawn" or "brother of the dawn") is the name given to a third-generation descendant of Benjamin (the eponymous forefather of the Tribe of Benjamin) in 1 Chronicles 7:10. This figure is mentioned nowhere else in the Hebrew Bible.

=== Ahishar ===
Ahishar (אחישר in Hebrew; meaning Brother of song, or singer), the officer who was "over the household" of Solomon (1 Kings 4:6).

=== Ahitub ===
Ahitub (אֲחִיטוּב) is the name of several minor biblical figures:

1. Ahitub, son of Phinehas, grandson of Eli, and brother of Ichabod. (1 Samuel 14:3,22:9–20)
2. Ahitub, son of Amariah and father of Zadok. (2 Samuel 8:15–17)
3. Ahitub, a descendant through the priestly line of the first Zadok. He was an ancestor of later high priests who served during the fall of Jerusalem and after the exile. (1 Chronicles 9:11)

=== Ahlai ===
Ahlai (אַחְלַי "O! would that!") is a name given to two individuals in the Books of Chronicles. In the opinion of Thomas Kelly Cheyne, the name is probably derived from "Ahiel" or a similar name.

- The first is either the son or daughter of a Jerahmeelite man named Sheshan.
- The second is the father or mother of Zabad, who is listed as one of David's Mighty Warriors in 1 Chronicles 11:41.

=== Ahoah ===
Ahoah (אֲחוֹחַ "brother of rest") was the son of Bela son of Benjamin. (1 Chronicles 8:4)

=== Aholibamah ===
Aholibamah was the name of 2 biblical individuals.

- Was the daughter of Anah and granddaughter of Zibeon the Hivite, son of Seir the Horite. She was one of two Canaanite women who married Esau, the son of Isaac, when he was in his forties. Isaac and his wife Rebecca, however, were greatly opposed to this union. So, according to some Biblical scholars, Esau changed her name to the Hebrew name "Judith", as to pacify his parents.
- A duke of Edom. (Genesis 36:41)

=== Ahumai ===
Ahumai (אֲחוּמַי "brother of water") was the son of Shobal or Jabath of the Tribe of Judah. He was head of one of the families of the Zorahites. (1 Chronicles 4:2)

=== Ahuzam ===
See Ahuzzam

=== Ahuzath ===
See Ahuzzath

=== Ahuzzah ===
See Ahuzzath

=== Ahuzzam ===
Ahuzzam or Ahuzam (אֲחֻזָּם "possessor") is the name of one of the sons of "Asshur, the father of Tekoa," in a genealogy describing the desceandants of the Tribe of Judah. He is mentioned only in 1 Chronicles 4:6.

=== Ahuzzath ===
Ahuzzath or Ahuzzah (אֲחֻזַּת "possession") is the name given to a friend or advisor of Abimelech, king of Gerar, in Genesis 26:26. According to the Book of Genesis, Ahuzzath accompanied Abimelech when Abimelech went to make a treaty with Isaac. He is not mentioned elsewhere in the Hebrew Bible; in particular, the parallel account of Abimelech's meeting with Abraham in Genesis 21 does not mention Ahuzzath.

=== Ahzai ===
Ahzai (KJV Ahasai Hebrew: אַחְזַי "my holder, protector") is a name which appears only in Nehemiah 11:13, where it is mentioned in passing. The verse refers to a priest, called "Amashsai son of Azarel son of Ahzai son of Meshillemoth son of Immer." In the parallel name in 1 Chronicles 9:12, the name "Jahzerah" replaces "Ahzai."

=== Aiah ===
Aiah (איה "Falcon") was the father of Rizpah, mentioned in 2 Samuel 3:7

=== Ajah ===
In Genesis 36:24 and 1 Chronicles 1:40, Ajah [איה] is a son of Zibeon. Ajah means hawk. Alternative spelling: Aiah.

=== Akan ===
In Genesis 36:27 Akan is a son of Ezer and grandson of Seir the Horite. In 1 Chronicles 1:42 he is called Jaakan.

=== Akkub ===
Akkub (עַקּוּב) was the name of 3 or 4 biblical individuals.

- In Ezra 2:45, Akkub is the head of a family of Nethinim.
- In 1 Chronicles 3:24, Akkub is a son of Elionenai, a descendant of Solomon living in the Kingdom of Judah.
- In 1 Chronicles 9:17, Ezra 2:42, Nehemiah 7:45 and Nehemiah 11:19, Akkub is listed as one of the Levite gatekeepers of Jerusalem after the return from the Babylonian captivity.
- A Levite who assisted Ezra in expounding the law. (Nehemiah 8:7)

=== Alameth ===
Alameth is one of the sons of Becher the son of Benjamin. (1 Chronicles 7:8)

=== Alemeth ===
Alemeth was the son of Jarah and the father of Azmaveth mentioned in 1 Chronicles 9:42.

=== Allon ===
In 1 Chronicles 4:37, Allon (אַלּוֹן "oak") is the son of Jedaiah, of the family of the Simeonites, who expelled the Hamites from the valley of Gedor.

=== Almodad ===
Almodad (אַלְמוֹדָד "not measured") is one of the sons of Joktan according to Genesis 10:26 and 1 Chronicles 1:20. While the Bible has no further history regarding Almodad, this patriarch is considered to be the founder of an Arabian tribe in "Arabia Felix". This is based on the identification of Joktan's other sons, such as Sheba and Havilah, who are both identified as coming from that region.

=== Alvah ===
In Genesis 36:40, Alvah (עַלְוָה) is a chief of Edom and a descendant of Esau. In 1 Chronicles 1:51 he is called Aliah.

=== Alvan ===
In Genesis 36:23, Alvan is the eldest son of Shobal and a descendant of Seir the Horite. In 1 Chronicles 1:40 he is called Alian.

=== Amal ===
Amal was the son of Helem of the tribe of Asher. (1 Chronicles 7:35)

=== Amariah ===
Amariah is the name of 8 or 9 biblical figures.

- A Levite in the line of Aaron-Eleazar; a son of Meraioth and grandfather of Zadok who lived in David's time. (1 Chronicles 6:7,52)
- A Levite of the descent of Kohath at the time of the division of the courses of the Levites by David. (1 Chronicles 23:19; 24:23)
- A Levite in the line of Eleazar a son of Azariah who "executed the priest's office in the house that Solomon built". (1 Chronicles 6:10) In Ezra 7:3 he is listed as an ancestor of Ezra.
- Chief priest and judge "in all matters of Yahweh" appointed by Jehoshaphat. (2 Chronicles 19:11) Could be the same as the previous Amariah.
- A descendant of Judah in the line of Perez and an ancestor of Ataiah who lived in Jerusalem after the Babylonian Exile. (Nehemiah 11:4) May be the same as Imri in 1 Chronicles 9:4.
- A Levite and an assistant of Kore appointed by king Hezekiah for the "oblations of Yahweh" to their brethren. (2 Chronicles 31:15)
- A son of Bani who married a foreign wife. (Ezra 10:42)
- A priest who with Nehemiah sealed the covenant; he had returned to Jerusalem with Zerubbabel and was the father of Jehohanan at the time of Joiakim. (Nehemiah 10:3; 12:2,13)
- An ancestor of the prophet Zephaniah. (Zephaniah 1:1)

=== Amasa ===
In 2 Chr 28:1–4, Amasa is the son of Hadlai, and one of the leaders of Ephraim (2 Chr 28:12) during the reign of the most wicked King Ahaz.

=== Amasai ===
Amasai (עֲמָשַׂי "burdensome") was the name of 3 or 4 biblical figures.

- A Kohathite, father of Mahath and ancestor of Samuel (1 Chronicles 6:25,35)
- Chief of the captains of Judah and Benjamin, who rushed to David while an outlaw in Ziklag (1 Chronicles 12:18).
- One of the priests who blew the trumpets before the Ark of the Covenant (1 Chronicles 15:24).
- Mentioned in 2 Chronicles 29:12, as the father of Mahath, one of the Levites who took a prominent part at the instance of Hezekiah in the cleansing of the temple.

=== Amashai ===
See Amashsai

=== Amashsai ===
Amashsai (Amashai in the King James Version, Hebrew: עֲמַשְׁסַי) son of Azareel, was appointed by Nehemiah to reside at Jerusalem and do the work of the temple. He merits only one mention in the whole Bible, in Nehemiah 11:13.

=== Amasiah ===
In 2 Chronicles 17:16, Amasiah (meaning burden of Jehovah) was the son of Zichri, a captain under King Jehoshaphat.

=== Amaziah ===
Amaziah is the name of 3 minor biblical figures.

- In Amos 7:10, Amaziah is a priest of Bethel who confronts Amos and rejects his prophesying against king Jeroboam II. As a result, Amos is led to prophesy the doom of Amaziah's family, the loss of his land and his death in exile. Jonathan Magonet has described Amaziah as 'a spiritual leader who believed in his own power and could not risk hearing the word of God'.
- A son of Hilkiah of the descendants of Ethan the Merarite (1 Chronicles 6:45).
- The father of Joshah, the chief of the Simeonites in the time of Hezekiah (1 Chronicles 4:34).

=== Ami ===
See Amon

=== Aminadab ===
See Amminadab

=== Amittai ===
The father of Jonah the prophet, and a native of Gath-hepher (2 Kings 14:25; Jonah 1:1). Mentioned in Islam by Muhammad. When Muhammad was returning from preaching in Ta'if and decided to take shelter in the garden of two leaders, Addas, a lowly servant boy, was sent to offer grapes to Muhammad. When Addas came, Muhammad asked which land he came from. Addas replied he was from Nineveh. Upon receiving this answer, Muhammad exclaimed "The town of Jonah, son of Amittai!" Overjoyed, Muhammad then told Addas how Jonah and he (Muhammad) were prophetic brothers.

=== Ammiel ===
Ammiel (עַמִּיאֵל "my kinsman is God") was the name of 4 biblical individuals.

- One of the spies Moses sent to the land of Canaan from the tribe of Dan. He was also one of the people who perished for their unpleasant report (Numbers 13:12; 14:37).
- The father of Machir of Lo-debar in whose house Mephibosheth resided (2 Samuel 9:4–5; 17:27).
- See Eliam
- The sixth son of Obed-edom the Levite and doorkeeper of the temple in 1 Chronicles 26:5.

=== Ammihud ===
Ammihud (עַמִּיהוּד "my kinsman is majesty") may refer to a quantity of 5 people in the Hebrew Bible:

- An Ephraimite. The son of Laadan (son of Tahan, son of Telah, son of Resheph, son of Rephah, son of Beriah, son of Joseph) and father of Elishama (father of Nun, father of Joshua). He is mentioned in Joshua's genealogy in 1 Chronicles 7:23–27.
- A Simeonite. The father of Shemuel, a chief appointed by Moses at the time of the Exodus. (Numbers 34:20)
- The father of Pedahel, a chief appointed by Moses to rule over the tribe of Naphtali. (Numbers 34:28)
- The father of Talmai, king of Geshur, to whom Absalom fled for refuge after the murder of Amnon. (2 Samuel 13:37)
- The son of Omri and father of Uthai, a descendant of Perez son of Judah. (1 Chronicles 9:4)

=== Amminadab ===
Amminadab was the name of 3 biblical individuals.

- The father of Nahshon the chief of the tribe of Judah. His daughter Elisheba married Aaron. He was also the ancestor of David and Jesus. (Numbers 1:7; 2:3; 7:12,17; 10:14; Exodus 6:23)
- See Izhar
- Chief of the 112 descendants of Uzziel the Levite. (1 Chronicles 5:11–12)

=== Amminadib ===
A person mentioned in the Old Testament in Song of Solomon 6:12, whose chariots were famed for their swiftness. It is rendered in the margin "my willing people," and in the Revised Version "my princely people."

=== Ammishaddai ===
In the Book of Numbers, Ammishaddai (Hebrew: עַמִּישַׁדָּי ‘Ammīšadāy "people of the Almighty") was the father of Ahiezer, who was chief of the Tribe of Dan at the time of the Exodus (Numbers 1:12; 2:25).

This is one of the few names compounded with the name of God, Shaddai.

=== Ammizabad ===
Ammizabad (עַמִּיזָבָד "my people have bestowed") was the son of Benaiah, who was the third and chief captain of the host under David (1 Chronicles 27:6).

=== Amnon ===
Amnon was one of the sons of Shimon, of the children of Ezra. (1 Chronicles 4:20)

=== Amok ===
Amok (עָמוֹק "to be deep") was a chief priest who came to Jerusalem with Zerubbabel and the ancestor of Eber who was priest in the day of Joiakim. (Nehemiah 12:7,20)

=== Amon ===
Amon was the name of 3 minor biblical individuals.

- A city governor in the time of Kings Jehoshaphat and Ahab
- Amon, king of Judah.
- The head of the "children of Solomon's servants" who returned from captivity; reckoned along with the Nethinim, or temple slaves. Called also Ami. (Nehemiah 7:59; Ezra 7:52)

=== Amoz ===
Amoz /ˈeɪmɒz/ (Hebrew: אָמוֹץ, Modern: ʼAmōṣ, Tiberian: ʼĀmōṣ), also known as Amotz, was the father of the prophet Isaiah, mentioned in Isaiah 1:1; 2:1 and 13:1, and in 2 Kings 19:2, 20; 20:1. The word "amoz" means strong

In Rabbinical Tradition, there is a Talmudic tradition that when the name of a prophet's father is given, the father was also a prophet, so that Amoz would have been a prophet like his son. The rabbis of the Talmud declared, based upon a rabbinic tradition, that Amoz was the brother of Amaziah (אמציה), the king of Judah at that time (and, as a result, that Isaiah himself was a member of the royal family). According to some traditions, Amoz is the "man of God" in 2 Chronicles 25:7–9 (Seder Olam Rabbah 20), who cautioned Amaziah to release the Israelite mercenaries that he had hired.

=== Amram ===
Amram is minor individual who was one of the sons of Bani that married a foreign wife in Ezra 10:34.

=== Amzi ===
Amzi ('am-tsee') is a masculine Hebrew name meaning "my strength" or "strong." Two individuals with this name are mentioned in the Bible:

- 1 Chronicles 6:31 indicates Amzi as a Levite man of the family of Merari.
- A son of Zechariah was named Amzi. He was an ancestor to the Levite priest Adaiah (Nehemiah 11:12), who was one of the Israelite exiles under the direction of Nehemiah when he returned to Jerusalem to rebuild the city walls.

=== Anah ===
In the Book of Genesis, there are two men and one woman named Anah (עֲנָה "answer").

- In Genesis 36:2,14,18,25, Anah is a daughter of Zibeon, and her daughter Aholibamah is a wife of Esau.
- In Genesis 36:20,29 and 1 Chronicles 1:38, Anah is a son of Seir and a brother of Zibeon chief of the Horites.
- In Genesis 36:24 and 1 Chronicles 1:40–41, Anah is a son of Zibeon, and is famed for discovering hot springs.

=== Anaiah ===
Anaiah, a name meaning "Yahweh has answered," appears only twice in the Hebrew Bible, with both appearances in Nehemiah.

- Ezra, a Jewish reformer, standing up to give a speech, with thirteen other people standing beside him. Anaiah is listed as one of those standing by.
- The second appearance of the name is in a list of people who signed a covenant between God and the Jewish people.

=== Anak ===
Anak was the father of Ahiman, Sheshai, and Talmai in Numbers 13:22

=== Anamim ===
Anamim (Hebrew: עֲנָמִים, ‘Ănāmīm) is, according to the Bible, either a son of Ham's son Mizraim or the name of a people descending from him. Biblical scholar Donald E. Gowan describes their identity as "completely unknown."

The name should perhaps be attached to a people in North Africa, probably in the surrounding area of Egypt. Medieval biblical exegete, Saadia Gaon, identified the Anamim with the indigenous people of Alexandria, in Egypt.

=== Anan ===
Anan was one of the Israelites who sealed the covenant after the return from Babylon (Nehemiah 10:26). While "Anan" (which means "Cloud") never became a very common name, a much later person so named – Anan Ben David (c. 715 – c. 795) is widely considered to be a major founder of the Karaite movement of Judaism.

=== Anani ===
Anani (עֲנָנִי "my cloud") is a name which appears in a genealogy in Chronicles. It refers to a son of Elioenai, and descendant of Zerubbabel. According to the Masoretic Text Anani was born six generations after Zerubbabel. For scholars, this six-generation span after Zerubbabel is the terminus a quo for the date of Chronicles—it implies that Chronicles could not have been written earlier than about 400 BCE. In the Septuagint, Anani is listed as eleven generations removed from Zerubbabel. For scholars who believe that the Septuagint reading for Anani's genealogy is correct, this places the earliest possible date for the writing of Chronicles at about 300 BCE.

=== Ananiah ===
Ananiah (עֲנַנְיָה "YHWH clouds") was the father of Maaseiah the father of Azariah (who assisted in rebuilding the city wall) was mentioned in the Book of Nehemiah specifically Nehemiah 3:23.

=== Anath ===
Anath (עֲנָת "answer"), being described in the Hebrew Bible, was the father of Shamgar, a judge of Israel who slew the Philistines with just using an ox goad. He is mentioned Judges 3:31 and 5:6.

=== Anathoth ===
Anathoth (עֲנָתוֹת "answers to prayer") was the son of Becher the son of Benjamin in 1 Chronicles 7:8.

=== Aner ===
Aner (/ˈeɪnər/; Hebrew: עָנֵר ‘Ānêr ) refers, in the Hebrew Bible, to one of three Amorite confederates of Abram in the Hebron area, who joined his forces with those of Abraham in pursuit of Chedorlaomer (Gen. 14:13, 24).

=== Aniam ===
Aniam (אֲנִיעָם "I am the people" or "lament of people") according to 1 Chronicles 7:19, was one of the sons of Shemida, a Manassehite.

=== Antothijah ===
See Anthothijah

=== Anthothijah ===
Anthothijah (עַנְתֹתִיָּה "YHWH's answer") is a name which appears only once in the Hebrew Bible, in a genealogical section listing descendants of Benjamin. It is most likely an adjective used to describe a female person from the town of Anathoth. Manuscripts of the Greek Septuagint give the name as Anothaith, Anathothia, Athein, or Anathotha.

=== Anub ===
Anub a'-nub (`anubh, "ripe") was the son of Hakkoz or Coz (1 Chronicles 4:8).

=== Aphiah ===
Aphiah (אֲפִיחַ "I will make to breathe"), of the tribe of Benjamin, was an ancestor of King Saul and of his commander Abner. According to Saul, his family was the least of the tribe of Benjamin. A son of Shchorim, the son of Uzziel (descendant of Gera, son of Benjamin) and Matri (ancestor of Matrites and descendant of Belah, son of Benjamin).

=== Aphses ===
See Happizzez

=== Appaim ===
Appaim (אַפַּיִם "nostrils") is a minor figure who appears in 1 Chronicles 2:30 and 31. He appears briefly in a genealogy of Jerahmeelites, in which he is the father Ishi, son of Appaim, son of Nadab, son of Shammai, son of Onam, son of Jerahmeel. In manuscripts of the Septuagint, he is called Ephraim, Aphphaim, or Opheim.

=== Ara ===
Ara (אֲרָא "lion") was one of the sons of Jether of the tribe of Asher (1 Chronicles 7:38).

=== Arad ===
Arad (עֲרָד "a wild ass") was one of the sons of Beriah (1 Chronicles 8:15).

=== Arah ===
Arah is the name of two minor biblical figures. The name may mean "wayfarer."

- Arah the son of Ulla appears as a member of the Tribe of Asher in the part of the Books of Chronicles devoted to outlining the genealogy of the twelve Tribes of Israel.
- In the Book of Ezra and the Book of Nehemiah, the "sons of Arah" are a group listed among the returnees to Jerusalem in the time of Nehemiah. Shechaniah, a "son of Shecaniah," was the father-in law of Tobiah the Ammonite.

=== Aram ===
Aram (אֲרָם) is the name of 3 biblical individuals.

- See Ram
- A son of Kemuel and grandson of Nahor and Milcah(Genesis 22:21).
- An Asherite and one of the sons of Shamer (1 Chronicles 7:34).

=== Aran ===
Aran (אֲרָן "joyous") is a Horite, the son of Dishan and brother of Uz, and a descendant of Esau (Genesis 36;28; 1 Chronicles 1:42).

=== Araunah ===
Araunah (Hebrew: אֲרַוְנָה ʾǍrawnā) was a Jebusite mentioned in the Second Book of Samuel, who owned the threshing floor on Mount Moriah which David purchased and used as the site for assembling an altar to God. The First Book of Chronicles, a later text, renders his name as Ornan (אָרְנָן ʾOrnān).

=== Arba ===
Arba (Hebrew: ארבע - literally "Four") was a man mentioned in the Book of Joshua. In Joshua 14:15, he is called the "greatest man among the Anakites." Joshua 15:13 says that Arba was the father of Anak.

=== Ard ===
Ard (Hebrew ארד) was the tenth son of Benjamin in Genesis 46:21. It is relatively unusual among Hebrew names for ending in a cluster of two consonants instead of as a segholate.

He is either directly or more remotely a son of Benjamin. Numbers 26:38-40 mentions five sons of Benjamin, together with Ard and Naaman, the sons of Bela, Benjamin's oldest son, counting all seven as ancestors of Benjamite families. In 1 Chronicles 8:1-3 Addar and Naaman are mentioned, with others, as sons of Bela, Addar and Ard being apparently the same name with the consonants transposed. In Genesis 46:21 ten sons of Benjamin are counted, including at least the three grandsons, Ard and Naaman and Gera.

=== Ardon ===
Ardon (ארדון "Bronze") a son of Caleb by Jerioth, 1st Chronicles 2:18

=== Areli ===
Areli (אַרְאֵלִי "lion of God") was a son of Gad according to Genesis 46:16 and Numbers 26:17. He was one of the 70 souls to migrate to Egypt with Jacob.

=== Argob ===
Argob was one of the men who came with Pekah to smite King Pekahiah mentioned in 2 Kings 15:25.

=== Aridai ===
Aridai was one of the children of Haman, all of their relatives were slain by the Jews and destroyed five hundred men.

=== Aridatha ===
Aridatha was a child of Haman executed by the Jews along with his siblings.

=== Arieh ===
Arieh was the name of one of the officers of King Pekahiah of the house of Manahen when Pekah the son of Remaliah went against the king.

=== Ariel ===
Ariel (אֲרִיאֵל) was one of the chief men sent by Ezra to procure Levites for the sanctuary according to Ezra 8:16.

=== Arioch ===
Arioch was the name of 2 minor biblical individuals.

- The king of Eliasar and served as an ally to king Chedorlaomer in his expedition in rebellious tributaries. The tablets recently discovered by Mr. Pinches show the true reading is Eri-Aku of Larsa. This Elamite name meant "servant of the moon-god." It was afterwards changed into Rimsin, "Have mercy, O moon-god."(Genesis 14:1)
- The captain of Nebuchadnezzar's body-guard. (Daniel 2:4)

=== Arisai ===
Arisai was one of the children of Haman in accordance to Esther 9:9. The Jews would later slay them fearing for the rise of a new threat unto their people.

=== Armoni ===
Armoni (אַרְמֹנִי "one of the palace") was one of the two named sons of Saul by Rizpah. He was delivered by the Gibeonites by David and then hanged. (2 Samuel 21:8–9)

=== Arnan ===
Arnan (אַרְנָן) was a descendant of David, father of Obadiah, and son of Rephaiah.

=== Arod ===
See Arodi

=== Arodi ===
Arodi or Arod was a son of Gad according to Genesis 46:16 and Numbers 26:17. He was one of the 70 souls to migrate to Egypt with Jacob.

=== Arza ===
Arza Ar'za (Heb. Artsa', אִרצָא, an Aramaean form, the earth; Sept. ᾿Ωρσά v. r. Α᾿ρσᾶ) was a steward or prefect of the palace at Tirzah to Elah king of Israel, whom Zimri assassinated at his banquet. (1 Kings 16:9) The text is not quite clear, and Arza might have been a servant of Zimri.

=== Asa ===
Asa, not to be confused with King Asa, was a son of Elkanah a Levite, who dwelt in one of the villages of the Netophathites. (1 Chronicles 9:16)

=== Asahel ===
Asahel was the name of 3 minor biblical individuals.

- One of the Levites in the reign of Jehoshaphat that went throughout all the cities of Judah instructing the people of the law. (2 Chronicles 17:8)
- A Levite in the reign of Hezekiah who was in charge of the tithes dedicated to the things of the temple. (2 Chronicles 31:13)
- A priest and the father of Jonathan in Ezra's time. (Ezra 10:15)

=== Asahiah ===
See Asaiah

=== Asaiah ===
Asaiah (עֲשָׂיָה "made by YHWH") was the name of 4 biblical individuals.

- A Levite of the family of Merari in the time of David and one of those who helped bring the ark from the house of Obed-edom to Jerusalem. (1 Chronicles 6:30; 15:6,11)
- A leading man of the tribe of Simeon in the time of king Hezekiah of Judah. He was in the incursion which attacked and dispossessed the \MEUNIM\ (which see), or the shepherd people, in the valley of Gedor. (1 Chronicles 4:36)
- An officer of Josiah, also called Asahiah whom Huldah the prophetess sent for advice regarding the law book found by Hilkiah. (2 Kings 22:12,14)
- See Maaseiah

=== Asaph ===
Asaph is the name of 3 minor biblical individuals.

- One of the Levites who led the choir (1 Chronicles 6:39) and the 50th chapter of Psalms is attributed to him. He is mentioned along with David as skilled in music, and a "seer" (2 Chronicles 29:30). His so-called 'sons' mentioned in 1 Chronicles 20:14 and Ezra 2:41 were probably his descendants that were poets and musicians who looked upon him as their leader.
- Hezekiah's recorder (2 Kings 18:18,37).
- The "keeper of the king's forest," to whom Nehemiah willed from Artaxerxes a letter that he may give him timber at the temple in Jerusalem (Nehemiah 2:8).

=== Asareel ===
Asareel (אֲשַׂרְאֵל "God holds"), according to a genealogical passages in the Book of Chronicles, was the son of a figure named Jehaleleel or Jehallelel. Asareel and Jehaleleel are mentioned only briefly, in a section of the genealogies adjacent to the descendants of Caleb, although the relationship between them and the descendants of Caleb is uncertain.

=== Asarelah ===
Asarelah, Asharelah or Jesharelah is one of the sons of Asaph, appointed sanctuary musician by David. (1 Chronicles 25:2)

=== Asharelah ===
See Asarelah

=== Ashbel ===
Ashbel (Hebrew, אשבל) is the third of the ten sons of Benjamin named in Genesis. He founded the tribe of Ashbelites.

=== Ashpenaz ===
Ashpenaz was the chief of the eunuchs serving King Nebuchadnezzar, named in Daniel 1:3 and subsequently referred to later in Daniel 1 simply as "the chief of the eunuchs", who selected Daniel, Hananiah, Mishael and Azariah, sons of the Jewish royal family and nobility, to be taken to Babylon to learn the language and literature of the Chaldeans. It was Ashpenaz who gave Daniel and his companions the names Belteshazzar, Shadrach, Meshach and Abed-Nego.

=== Ashriel ===
See Asriel

=== Ashur ===
Ashur (אַשְׁחוּר) was the posthumous son of Hezron and his wife Abiah. He became the father or 'founder' of the town, Tekoa. (1 Chronicles 2:24; 4:5)

=== Ashvath ===
Ashvath (עַשְׁוָת "sleek") was of the tribe of Asher, of the family of Japhlet. (1 Chronicles 7:33)

=== Asiel ===
Asiel (עֲשִׂיאֵל "made by God") is listed as one of the descendants of Simeon in 1 Chronicles 4:35. In the deuterocanonical Tobit 1:1, Tobit's family are descendants of Asiel, of the tribe of Naphtali.

=== Asnah ===
Asnah (אַסְנָה) was mentioned as the people of the province who came up from the captivity of the exiles, whom Nebuchadnezzar king of Babylon had taken captive to Babylon as temple servants. His descendants were among the Nethinim. (Ezra 2:50)

=== Aspatha ===
Aspatha was one of the ten sons of Haman executed by the Jews. (Esther 9:7)

=== Asriel ===
Asriel (אַשְׂרִיאֵל) was a son of Manasseh according to Numbers 26:31, Joshua 17:2, and 1 Chronicles 7:14.

=== Asshur ===
Asshur or Ashur (אַשּׁוּר) was the son of Shem. He went from the land of Shinar and built Nineveh. He probably gave his name to Assyria, which is the usual translation of the word, although the form Asshur is sometimes retained. (Genesis 10:11–12, 22; 1 Chronicles 1:17)

=== Asshurim ===
Asshurim is mentioned in Genesis 25:3, as one of the sons of Dedan. It is likely that this was the term that refers to the descendants of Dedan. Specific identification is not possible, but some north Arabian tribe is probably meant. They should not be confused, however, with the Assyrians who were descendants of Shem's son Asshur.

=== Assir ===
There are 2 biblical individuals named Assir (אַסִּיר):

- A son of Korah of the house of Levi according to Exodus 6:24, born in Egypt. It was also the firstborn son of Jehoiachin, King of Judah. Perhaps there is enough ambiguity here to assume that "Assir" is actually an adjective. The text is too vague to be certain... i.e. 1 Chronicles 3:17. Jehoiachin was the last free king of Judah before being led off to captivity... "prisoner" could be a more descriptive use of "Assir" as opposed to the name of a son. Maybe. According to 1 Chronicles 6 he was the son of Abiasaph instead of being the son of Korah.
- The firstborn of King Jehoiachin from the tribe of Judah. He is mentioned briefly in 1 Chronicles 3:17 at the time of the Babylonian exile in 587/6 BC.

=== Atarah ===
Atarah (עֲטָרָה "a crown") was the wife of Jerahmeel the son of Hezron according to 1 Chronicles 2:26, and was the mother of Onam, and the step-mother of Jerahmeel's firstborns.

=== Ater ===
Ater (אָטֵר "left-handed") was the name of 2 or possibly 1 biblical individual in the time of the Babylonian exile.

- The head of his 98 descendants who came with Zerubbabel from Babylon. (Ezra 2:16; Nehemiah 7:21) The King James Version translates his name as Ater of Hezekiah while the Revised Edition of 1 Esdras 5:15 has Ater of Ezekias, margin, "Ater of Hezekiah." the King James Version has "Aterezias." The name also appears in (Ezra 2:42; (Nehemiah 7:45), possibly another Ater, but could be the same of number 1. Ater is further mentioned in Nehemiah 10:17, who signed the covenant of Nehemiah.

=== Athaiah ===
Athaiah (עֲתָיָה) the son of Uzziah is a person listed in Nehemiah as a Judahite inhabitant of Jerusalem. The meaning of the name is uncertain.

=== Athaliah ===
Athaliah was the name of 2 minor biblical individuals.

- A Benjamite who dwelt at Jerusalem. (1 Chronicles 8:26)
- The father of Jeshaiah who returned with Ezra in Ezra 8:7.

=== Athlai ===
Athlai (עַתְלַי "whom YHWH afflicts"), a descendant of Bebai, is listed in the book of Ezra as one of the men who married foreign women. The name is a contraction of "Athaliah." In the equivalent lis in 1 Esdras, the name "Amatheis" or "Ematheis" appears in the same place.

=== Attai ===
Attai (עַתַּי "time") was the name of 2 biblical individuals:

- The son of Jarha and one of the daughters of Sheshan who had no sons but had daughters. He was the father of Nathan the Prophet mentioned in 1 Chronicles 2:36.
- One of the sons of Maacah the daughter of Absalom mentioned in 2 Chronicles 11:20.

=== Azaliah ===
Azaliah son of Meshullam is mentioned in passing as the father of the scribe Shaphan in 2 Kings 22:3 and the copy of the same verse found in 2 Chronicles 34:8. The name means "Yahweh has reserved." A bulla reading "belonging to Azaliahu son of Meshullam" is likely to be his, according to archaeologist Nahman Avigad.

=== Azaniah ===
Azaniah is mentioned in passing in Nehemiah 10:9 (10 in some Bibles) as the name the father of Levite who signed the covenant of Nehemiah. The name means "Yahweh listened."

=== Azarael ===
See Azarel

=== Azarel ===
Azarel (Hebrew: עֲזַרְאֵל), Azareel, or Azarael was the name of 6 biblical individuals found in the Hebrew Bible:

- A Korahite individual who was one of the mighty men, helpers of the war who came to David to Ziklag. He along with other warriors were described as having armed with arrows. (1 Chronicles 12:6)
- A musician who played in the temple (1 Chronicles 25:17)
- The son of Jeroham and the leader over the Tribe of Dan of the hosts of David mentioned in 1 Chronicles 27:22
- An individual who married "strange wives" (i.e. heathen women) and the son of Bani according to Ezra 10:41.
- The father of Amashai a priest after the exile and the son Ahzai in Nehemiah 11:13
- An associate of the priest who played the trumpets in the procession when the walls were dedicated. (Nehemiah 12:36)

=== Azareel ===
See Azarel

=== Azariah ===
Azariah (Hebrew – עזריהו azaryahu "God Helped"). There are 20 minor biblical figures named Azariah

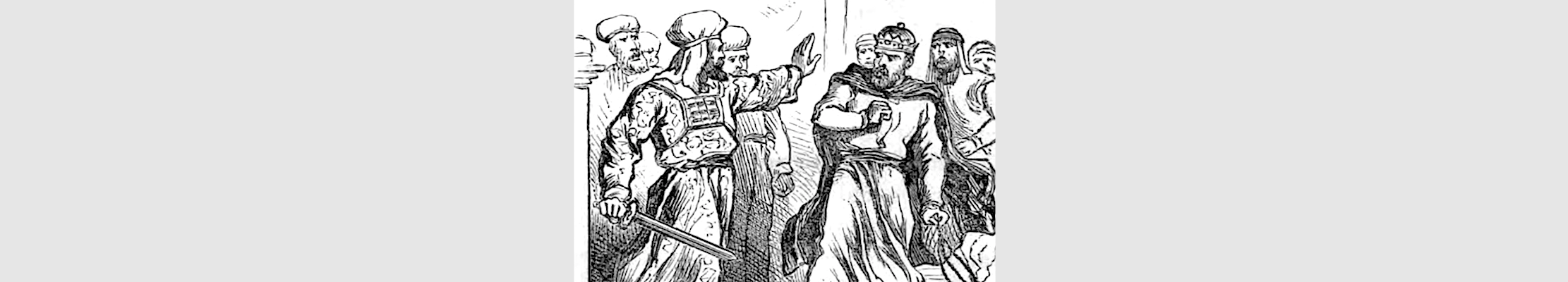
Uzziah getting driven out of the temple by the High Priest Azariah II by Paul Hardy.

- Azariah the father of Amariah and the son of Meraioth, could possibly be a High Priest since his father and sons are High Priests too. He is mentioned in 1 Chronicles 6:11 and Ezra 7:3.
- Azariah (prophet), a prophet (2 Chronicles 15:1–8)
- Azariah (high priest) high priest of Israel (1 Kings 4:2)
- Azariah II, another high priest, in the reign of Uzziah (2 Chronicles 26:17–20)
- Azariah the son of Nathan in charge of the district officers with Zabud one of the mighty soldiers of David, Solomon's father was the personal adviser of Solomon.
- A descendant of Zerah the son of Judah (son of Jacob) mentioned in 1 Chronicles 2:8 as the son of Ethan the son of Zerah.
- A prince of Judah who joined in the procession with Nehemiah in Nehemiah 12:32–33.
- Azariah the son of Jehu and the father of Helez was a Jerahmeelite mentioned in 1 Chronicles 2:38–39.
- Azariah IV was a descendant of Aaron and the father of Seraiah which became the father of Jehozadak the father of Joshua the High Priest according to 1 Chronicles 6:14.
- Azariah the son of Jehalelel one of the Levites who arose up mentioned in 2 Chronicles 29:12.
- Azariah the son of Maaseiah the son of Ananiah who helped rebuilt the temple is mentioned in Nehemiah 3:23–24.
- Azariah the son of Johanan and chief of the tribe of Ephraim mentioned in 2 Chronicles 28:12.
- Azariah the son of Hoshaiah along with other men who spoke against Jeremiah saying that his words were wrong to go to Egypt and settle there according to Jeremiah 43:2. Jeremiah describes them as being proud.
- Azariah the son of Uzziah or Zephaniah and an ancestor of Samuel.
- One of the Israelites who returned with Zerubbabel in Nehemiah 7:7. He is also called Seraiah.
- One of the sons of King Jehoshaphat, he was probably one of the brothers that King Jehoram killed.
- Another son of King Jehoshaphat, he is also called Azariahu in the NIV Bible. He is mentioned in 1 Chronicles 21:2.
- One of the Levites who instructed the people in the Law while the people were standing there.
- Two "commanders of the hundreds" who formed part of Jehoiada's campaign to restore the kingship to Joash in 2 Chronicles 23: Azariah, son of Jeroham and Azariah son of Obed.

=== Azaz ===
Azaz (עָזָז "strong") was from the Tribe of Reuben. he was the father of Bela and son of Shema. (1 Chronicles 5:8)

=== Azaziah ===
Azaziah (עֲזַזְיָהוּ "YHWH is mighty") was the name of 3 biblical individuals.

- One of the Levitical harpers in the temple in the reign of David during the transportation of the ark from Obed-edom to Jerusalem. (1 Chronicles 15:21)
- The father of Hoshea who was made ruler over the Ephraimites when David took the census. (1 Chronicles 27:20)
- An individual in charge of the temple offerings in the reign of king Hezekiah of Judah. (2 Chronicles 31:13)

=== Azbuk ===
Azbuk (עַזְבּוּק "strong devastation") was the father of Nehemiah, the ruler of the half-district Beth Zur, and made repairs up to a point opposite the tombs of David, as far as the artificial pool and the House of the Heroes. (Nehemiah 3:16)

=== Azel ===
Azel (אָצֵל) was a Benjamite descendant of Saul and Jonathan, the son of Eleasah and the father of 6 children: Azrikam, Bocheru, Ishmael, Sheariah, Obadiah and Hanan according to 1 Chronicles 9:43–44.

=== Azgad ===
Azgad is the name of a Levite who signed Ezra's covenant. The name means "Gad is strong."

=== Aziel ===
See Jaaziel.

=== Aziza ===
Aziza (עֲזִיזָא "strong") was a layman who is from the family of Zattu that married a foreign wife. (Ezra 10:27) He is also called Zardeus in 1 Esdras 9:28.

=== Azmaveth ===
Azmaveth (עַזְמָוֶת "strong unto death") was the name of 4 biblical individuals.

- One of David's mighty warriors and a native of Bahurim and possibly a Benjamite. (2 Samuel 23:31; 1 Chronicles 11:33)
- A descendant of Mephibosheth. (1 Chronicles 8:36; 9:42)
- The father of Jeziel and Pelet who were skilled Benjamite archers or slingers that joined David in Ziklag. (1 Chronicles 10:3)
- Overseer of the treasures of David. (1 Chronicles 27:25)

=== Azriel ===
Azriel (עַזְרִיאֵל "my help is God") was the name of 3 biblical individuals.

- The head of a house of the half tribe of Manasseh in Jordan. He is a man of renown. (1 Chronicles 5:24)
- A Naphtalite and ancestor of Jerimoth the head of David's census. (1 Chronicles 27:19)
- The father of Seraiah the officer of the time of Jehoiakim. (Jeremiah 36:26)

=== Azrikam ===
Azrikam (עַזְרִיקָם "help against the enemy") was the name of 4 biblical individuals

- A son of Neariah and a descendant of Zerubbabel.
- A Benjamite, one of the six sons of Azel, and descendant of Saul in 1 Chronicles 8:38.
- A Levite, ancestor of Shemaiah in the time of Nehemiah, mentioned in 1 Chronicles 9:14.
- Prefect of the house of Ahaz who slained by Zichri, in the successful attempt to evade Judah by Pekah. (2 Chronicles 28:7)

=== Azubah ===
Azubah (עֲזוּבָה "forsaken") was the name of 2 biblical individuals.

- The wife of Caleb son of Hezron. (1 Chronicles 2:18–19)
- The wife of King Asa and mother of Jehoshaphat. She was the daughter of Shilhi. (1 Kings 22:42; 2 Chronicles 20:31)

=== Azur ===
See Azzur

=== Azzan ===
Azzan (Hebrew עַזָּן "strong") was the father of Paltiel, a prince of the Tribe of Issachar. (Num. 34:26).

=== Azzur ===
Azzur (עַזּוּר) was the name of 3 biblical individuals named in the Hebrew Bible.

- The father of the false prophet Hananiah, who disputes Jeremiah's prophecy. (Jeremiah 28:1) Hananiah's death was predicted by Jeremiah, and later, in 2 months the prediction was fulfilled. Also called Azur
- One of the Israelites who signed Nehemiah's covenant in Nehemiah 10:17.
- The father of Jaazeniah, one of the princes who gave a wicked counsel to the city of Jerusalem. (Ezekiel 11:1) His name may also be translated as Azur in the King James Version.

== B ==
=== Baal ===
Baal (Hebrew: בַּעַל baal) was the name of 2 minor biblical individuals.

- A Benjamite, the son of Jehiel. (1 Chronicles 8:30; 9:36)
- A Reubenite and son of Reaiah and father of Beerah whom Tiglath-Pileser king of Assyria took into exile. Beerah was a leader of the Reubenites. (1 Chronicles 5:5)

=== Baal-hanan ===
Baal-hanan (בַּעַל חָנָן "Baal is gracious") was the name of 2 biblical individuals.

- An early king of Edom, being the son of Achbor in Genesis 36:38–39. He is also mentioned in the king's list in 1 Chronicles 1:49–50 and succeeded Saul, and he himself was succeeded by Hanan.

His native city is not given. For this and other reasons, Joseph Marqaurt supposes that "son of Achbor" is a duplicate of "son of Beor" in Genesis 36:2, and that "Baal-hanan" in the original manuscripts is given as the name of the father of the next king, Hadar.

- A gardener of "the olive trees and sycomore trees in the low plains" in the service of David. Of the city of Geder. (1 Chronicles 27:28)

=== Baana ===
Baana (בַּעֲנָה "answer") was the name of 3 or 2 biblical figures:

- A man who accompanied Zerubbabel from captivity (Ezra 2:2; Nehemiah 10:27) Possibly the same as Nehemiah 7:7.
- The father of Zadok the builder (Nehemiah 3:4).

=== Baanah ===
(Hebrew: בַעֲנָא "in the question")

- One of Ish-bosheth's army captains (2 Samuel 4:2)
- Baanah the Netophathite was the father of Heleb, one of King David's Warriors (2 Samuel 23:29, 1 Chronicles 11:30).
- Baanah the son of Ahilud, was one of Solomon's twelve regional administrators, having jurisdiction over Taanach, Meggido, and Beth-shean (1 Kings 4:12).
- Baanah the son of Hushai, was one of Solomon's twelve regional administrators, having jurisdiction over Asher and Aloth (1 Kings 4:16).

=== Baara ===
Baara (בָּעֲרָא "in a hurry") was one of the three wives of Shaharaim, a Benjamite, according to 1 Chronicles 8:8.

=== Baaseiah ===
Baaseiah (Hebrew:באשעיה Meaning: the Lord is bold) was a Gershonite Levite as the son of Michael and the father of Malkijah according 1 Chronicles 6:25. He was also an ancestor of Asaph the seer or poet.

=== Bakbakkar ===
Bakbakkar (בַּקְבַּקַּר "searcher"), according to the Hebrew Bible, was a Levite dwelling in the villages of the Netophathites, and later carried captive into Babylon. (1 Chronicles 9:15) He is also one of the descendants of Asaph.

=== Bakbuk ===
Bakbuk (meaning: "bottle" perhaps onomatopoetic), was the ancestor of the children of Bakbuk who were among the Nethinim and returned from Babylon (Ezra 2:51; Nehemiah 7:53).

=== Bakbukiah ===
Bakbukiah (בַּקְבֻּקְיָה) was the name of 2 biblical figures.

- A Levite who dwelt in Jerusalem who returned from captivity (Nehemiah 11:17); perhaps the same in Nehemiah 12:9.
- A porter keeping watch of the store house of the gates (Nehemiah 12:25).

=== Bakkuk ===
See Bakbuk

=== Bani ===
Bani (בָּנִי "my son") was the name of 16 individuals in the Hebrew Bible.

- A Gadite and one of David's mighty men (2 Samuel 23:36).
- A Levite, whose son was appointed to service at the tabernacle at David's rule (1 Chronicles 6:46).
- A Judahite whose son lived in Jerusalem after the exile (1 Chronicles 9:4).
- See Binnui
- One who took a strange wife, along with his brothers being the son of Bani (Ezra 10:34,38).
- Son of Bani, a Levite and builder (Nehemiah 6:17).
- Instructed the people in Ezra's time (Nehemiah 8:7).
- Three Levites mentioned in connection with temple worship at Ezra's time (Nehemiah 9:4,5).
- A Levite who sealed the covenant (Nehemiah 10:13).
- A leader of a people who also signed the covenant (Nehemiah 10:14).
- The father of Uzzi who led as an overseer in Jerusalem (Nehemiah 11:22).

=== Barachel ===
Barachel (בָּרַכְאֵל "God blesses") was a Buzite, and was the father of Elihu, an antagonist of Job, according to Job 32:2.

=== Bariah ===
Bariah (בָּרִיחַ "fleeing" or "fugitive") was a descendant of the royal family of Judah, being one of the three sons of Shemaiah (1 Chronicles 3:22).

=== Barkos ===
Barkos (בַּרְקוֹס) was a painter who was the father of some of the Nethinim, and head of a family of temple-slaves who returned from exile with Zerubbabel according to Ezra 2:53.

=== Baruch ===
Baruch was the name of 3 minor biblical individuals.

- A priest, the son of Zabbai, who helped in rebuilding the Wall of Jerusalem (Nehemiah 3:20).
- A priest who signed the covenant with Nehemiah (Nehemiah 10:6).
- The son of Col-hozeh, a descendant of Pharez of the tribe of Judah (Nehemiah 11:5).

=== Barzillai ===
Barzillai [ברזלי "Iron-like"] was the name of 2 biblical individuals.

- The Gileadite of Rogelim was 80 years old at the time of Absalom's revolt against King David. Barzillai supplied provisions for David's army at Mahanaim (2 Samuel 17:27–29). After the death of Absalom, being an old man, he was unable to accompany the king back to Jerusalem, but brought Chimham to David for the return journey (2 Samuel 19:31–37).
- Another figure who married one of Barzillai's daughters was called Barzellai as a result (Ezra 2:61; Nehemiah 7:63). In 1 Esdras 5:38, he is called Zorzelleus.

=== Basemath ===
Hebrew: Sweet-smelling or Sweet-smile

1. Basemath, wife of Esau, and daughter of Elon the Hittite (Genesis 26:34). She is thought to be identical to or a sister to Adah who is mentioned in Genesis 36.
2. Basemath, another wife of Esau, daughter of Ishmael, sister to Nebajoth and mother of Reuel (Genesis 36:3). She is thought by some scholars to be the same as Mahalath of Genesis 28.
3. Basemath, the daughter of Solomon; a wife of Ahimaaz. (1 Kings 4:15)

=== Bavai ===
Bavai (bawway; Septuagint Codex Alexandrinus, Benei; Codex Vaticanus, Bedei; the King James Version Bavai, "wisher"), was mentioned as one of those who helped rebuilt the wall of Jerusalem.

=== Bazlith ===
Bazlith (בַצְלִית) or Bazluth (בַּצְלוּת) was the ancestor whose descendants were among the Nethinim, and returned with Zerubbabel (Nehemiah 7:54; Ezra 2:52)

=== Bazluth ===
See Bazlith

=== Bealiah ===
Bealiah (בְּעַלְיָה, Be‘alyah) or Baalyah, a Benjamite, was one of David's thirty heroes who went to Ziklag, mentioned in 1 Chronicles 12:5. The name derives from Baal and Jah, and according to the International Standard Bible Encyclopedia (1915) means "Yahweh is Lord."

=== Bebai ===
Bebai (בֵּבַי) was the name of 3 biblical individuals.

- Ancestor of those who returned with Ezra, to Jerusalem (Ezra 8:11). His descendants were 623 which returned with Zerubbabel to Jerusalem (Ezra 2:11). Nehemiah 7:6, gives the number of 628. Most of his descendants married foreign wives (Ezra 10:28).
- Father of Zechariah and a descendant of Bebai (Ezra 8:11).
- Chief of the people who signed the covenant (Nehemiah 10:15).

=== Becher ===
Becher (בֶכֶר) was the name of two individuals mentioned in the Bible:

- The second of ten sons of Benjamin according to Genesis 46:21 and 1 Chronicles 7:6
- A son of Ephraim according to Numbers 26:35. His descendants were referred to as Bachrites.

=== Bechorath ===
Becorath (בְּכוֹרַת "first-born"), son of Aphiah, of the tribe of Benjamin, was an ancestor of King Saul and of his commander Abner. According to Saul, his family was the least of the tribe of Benjamin. (1 Samuel 9)

=== Becorath ===
See Bechorath

=== Bedad ===
Bedad (בְּדַד "solitary") was the father of Hadad of Edom, (Genesis 36:35). In 1 Chronicles 1:46, either he, his son or both defeated the Midianites in Moab and their city was named Avith.

=== Bedan ===
Bedan (בְּדָן "in judging") was the name of 2 biblical figures.

- One of the leaders of Israel, mentioned along with Gideon, Jephthah and Samuel who was commemorated as one of the deliverers of the nation (1 Samuel 12:11). It is likely that the text refers to Barak in the Septuagint, Syriac and Arabic.
- One of the sons of Ulam of the tribe of Manasseh (1 Chronicles 7:17).

=== Bedeiah ===
Bedeiah (בֵּדְיָה "servant of YHWH"), an Israelite exile, is a descendant of Bani who married a foreign wife (Ezra 10:35).

=== Beera ===
Beera (בְּאֵרָא "a well") was a son of Zophah and from the tribe of Asher (1 Chronicles 7:37).

=== Beerah ===
Beerah (בְּאֵרָה "well") was one of the princes of Reuben whom Tiglath-Pileser III carried away to Assyria (1 Chronicles 5:6). He was the son of Baal.

=== Beeri ===
Beeri (בְּאֵרִי "my well") was the name of 2 biblical individuals.

- The father of the prophet Hosea (Hosea 1:1). Jewish tradition says that he only uttered a few words of prophecy, and as they were insufficient to be embodied in a book by themselves, they were incorporated in the Book of Isaiah, viz., verses 19 and 20 of the 8th chapter. As such, Beeri is considered a prophet in Judaism.
- The Hittite father of Judith wife of Esau (Genesis 26:34).

=== Beker ===
See Becher.

=== Bela ===
Hebrew: בלע BeLa' "Crooked"

Bela was the name of three individuals mentioned in the Bible:

- Bela ben Beor, an Edomite king according to Genesis 36:32 and 1 Chronicles 1:43
- (also "Belah") The first of ten sons of Benjamin according to Genesis 46:21, Numbers 26:38, and 1 Chronicles 7 and 8.
- A son of Azaz according to 1 Chronicles 5:8

=== Belah ===
See Bela

=== Ben ===
See Jaaziel

=== Ben Abinadab ===
Ben Abinadab (Hebrew בנ אבינדב BeN ,'aḄYNaDaḄ "My Father is Liberal"), was one of King Solomon's twelve regional administrators; he was over Dor, and he was married to Taphath, a daughter of Solomon. 1 Kings 4:11 (RSV).

=== Ben-Ammi ===
Ben-Ammi (Hebrew בן־עמי for "son of my people") was the son of Lot and his youngest daughter. He became the father of the Ammonites (see Genesis 19:36–38).

=== Ben Deker ===
Ben Dekar (Hebrew בנ דקר BeN DeQeR "Son of Pick"), was one of King Solomon's twelve regional administrators; he was over Makaz, Shaalbim, Beth-shemesh, and Elon-beth-hanan. 1 Kings 4:9 (RSV).

=== Ben Geber ===
Ben Geber (Hebrew בנ גבר BeN GeḄeR "Son of He-Man"), was one of King Solomon's twelve regional administrators; he was responsible for Ramoth-Gilead and Argob (1 Kings 4:13).

=== Ben-hail ===
Ben-hail (Hebrew: Ben-Cha'yil, בֶּןאּחִיַל, son of strength, i.e. warrior; Sept. translates οἱ υἱοὶ τῶν δυνατῶν), was one of the princes sent by king Jehoshaphat throughout the Kingdom of Judah, as to fulfill the king's reformation.

=== Ben-hanan ===
Ben-hanan (בֶּן־חָנָן "son of favor") was the son of Shimon in the line of Judah (1 Chronicles 4:20).

=== Ben Hesed ===
Ben Hesed (Hebrew בנ חסד ben hesed "Son of Grace"), was one of King Solomon's twelve regional administrators; he was over Aruboth, Sochoh, and Hepher. 1 Kings 4:10 (RSV).

=== Ben Hur ===
Ben Hur (Hebrew בנ חור Ben Hur "Son of Hur") was one of King Solomon's twelve regional administrators; he was over Ephraim. 1 Kings 4:8 (RSV).

=== Ben-Zoheth ===
Ben-Zoheth (בֶּן־זוֹחֵת "son of Zoheth") was a descendant of Judah being a descendant of Ishi (1 Chronicles 4:20).

=== Benaiah ===
Benaiah was the name of 12 minor biblical individuals.

- A Pirathonite, and one of David's mighty men who was chief of the course in the 11th month, numbering 24,000 (2 Samuel 23:30; 1 Chronicles 11:31; 27:14).
- Chief over the house of Simeon (1 Chronicles 4:36).
- A Levite appointed as a singer with "psalteries set to Alamoth" (1 Chronicles 15:18,20; 16:5).
- A priest who was appointed by Yahweh to blow the trumpet before the Ark of the Covenant (1 Chronicles 15:24; 16:6).
- The father of Jehoiada (1 Chronicles 27:34). Possibly the same as the prominent Benaiah.
- An ancestor of Jahaziel of the house of Asaph (2 Chronicles 20:14).
- An overseer in the service of Hezekiah (2 Chronicles 31:13).
- Four different men who married foreign wives (Ezra 10:25,30,35,43).
- The father of Pelatiah seen in the visions of Ezekiel the prophet (Ezekiel 11:1,3).

=== Beninu ===
Beninu (בְּנִינוּ "our son") was a returning Levite exile who sealed the covenant with Nehemiah (Nehemiah 10:13–14).

=== Benjamin ===
Benjamin was the name of 2 minor biblical individuals.

- A Benjamite being the son of Bilhan, and the head of the family of warriors (1 Chronicles 7:10).
- One of the sons of Harim, who married a foreign wife (Ezra 10:32).

=== Beno ===
Beno was the son of Merari and from Jaaziah 1 Chronicles 24:26–27.

=== Beor ===
Beor was the name of 2 biblical figures.

- The father of king Bela of Edom who was one of the kings of Edom who reigned "before there reigned any king over the children of Israel" (Genesis 36:31–32; 1 Chronicles 1:43).
- The father of Balaam who in Jewish Tradition is venerated as a prophet (Numbers 22–24; 31:8; Joshua 13:22). He and other men who were fathers of notable prophets is also mentioned and commemorated.

=== Berachah ===
Berachah (בְּרָכָה "blessing") was one of the Benjamite warriors who joined David in Ziklag (1 Chronicles 12:3).

=== Beraiah ===
Beraiah (בְּרָאיָה "YHWH has created") was the son of Shimhi, chief man of Benjamin (1 Chronicles 8:21).

=== Berechiah ===
Berechiah was the name of 7 biblical figures.

- The father of the prophet Zechariah and son of Iddo (Zechariah 1:1; 11:7). Also called Jeberechiah or Jeberekiah in Isaiah 8:2.
- One of the sons of Zerubbabel (1 Chronicles 3:19–20).
- The father of Asaph the seer (1 Chronicles 6:39; 15:17).
- An inhabitant of Jerusalem and a Levite (1 Chronicles 9:16)
- The doorkeeper for the ark in David's time (1 Chronicles 15:23).
- One of the heads of the tribe of Ephraim (2 Chronicles 28:12).
- The father of Meshullam the builder during Nehemiah's time (Nehemiah 3:4,30; 6:18).

=== Beriah ===
Beriah is the name of four different biblical individuals:

- One of Asher's four sons, and father of Heber and Malchiel.
- A son of Ephraim (1 Chr. 7:20–23), born after the killing of Ephraim's sons Ezer and Elead, and so called by his father "because disaster had befallen his house." He was the father of Rephah, the ancestor of Joshua son of Nun son of Elishama.
- A Benjamite, son of Elpaal. He and his brother Shema expelled the Gittites, and were patriarchs to the inhabitants of Ajalon. His sons were Michael, Ishpah and Joha. (1 Chr. 8:13)
- A Levite, the son of Shimei. He was jointly patriarch of a clan with his brother Jeush. (1 Chr. 23:10–11)

=== Bered ===
Bered (בֶּרֶד "hail") was the son of Shulethah, being the grandson of Ephraim (1 Chronicles 7:20).

=== Beri ===
Beri (בֵּרִי "a well") was the son of Zophah of the tribe of Asher (1 Chronicles 7:36).

=== Besai ===
Besai (בֵּסַי "my treading") was the ancestor of the Nethinim who returned with Zerubbabel to Jerusalem (Ezra 2:49; Nehemiah 7:52).

=== Besodeiah ===
Besodeiah (בְּסוֹדְיָה "with the counsel of YHWH" or "in the secret of the Lord") was the father of another Meshullam, who was another builder of the wall of Jerusalem in the time of Nehemiah (Nehemiah 3:6).

=== Beth-rapha ===
Beth-rapha (בֵּית רָפָא "house of healing") was a descendant of Judah being the son of Eshton (1 Chronicles 4:12).

=== Bethuel ===
Bethuel was the youngest son of Nahor and Milcah. Nephew of Abraham and father of Rebecca and Laban (Genesis 22:21–23).

=== Beth Zur ===
Beth Zur (בֵּית צוּר "house of the rock") is mentioned in (1 Chr. 2:45) as the son of Maon the son of Shammai. He is also a Jerahmeelite.

=== Bezai ===
Bezai (בֵּצַי) was the name of 2 biblical individuals.

- A chief who sealed the covenant (Nehemiah 10:18).
- His 323 descendants (Nehemiah 7:23) or 324 (Ezra 2:17) returned with Zerubbabel to Jerusalem.

=== Bezalel ===
Bezalel (בְּצַלְאֵל) was an architect who constructed the ark in connection with the tabernacle in the wilderness, he was engaged principally in works of metal, wood, and stone; while Aholiab, who was associated with him and subordinate to him, had the charge of the textile fabrics (Exodus 31:2; 35:30; 36:1–2; 38:22).

=== Bezaleel ===
Bezaleel (בְּצַלְאֵל) was one of the descendants of Pahath-Moab guilty of intermarriage (Ezra 10:30).

=== Bezer ===
Bezer (בֶּצֶר "gold ore" or "remote fortress") was from the tribe of Asher being the son of Zophah (1 Chronicles 7:37).

=== Bichri ===
Bichri (בִּכְרִי "youthful") was a Benjamite being the father of Sheba who led an insurrection against king David; whom Joab and his army pursued and lob his head over the town's wall (2 Samuel 20:1).

=== Bidkar ===
Bidkar (Hebrew: בדקר) was an officer of the Israelite king Jehu. Jehu ordered Bidkar to throw the body of the king he usurped, Jehoram, into the field of Naboth, fulfilling prophecy. 2 Kings 9:25

=== Bigtha ===
See Biztha

=== Bigthana ===
Bigthana (Hebrew: בִּגְתָן, בִּגְתָנָא Bīgṯān, Bīgṯānāʾ) was a eunuch of king Ahasuerus who in the Greek Septuagint translation of the Bible, they were known as Gabatha (Koine Greek: Γαβαθά καὶ Θαρρα). Bigthan's name is also spelled "Bigtan" or "Bigthana". It is a Persian name which means "Gift of God". He and Theresh were planning to kill the king whom Mordecai warned Ahasuerus of.

=== Bigvai ===
The name Bigvai (בִּגְוַי) occurs several times in Ezra-Nehemiah (Ezra 2:2, 14, 8:14, Nehemiah 7:7, 19 and 10:16). That refers to 3 people. In the last of these he is one of the "leaders of the people". By 408 B.C. the Elephantine papyri show that Sanballat was the governor of Samaria, and Bigvai the governor of Jerusalem but Wright says that "it is not suggested that any of these [referred to in Ezra-Nehemiah] is the man who later became governor.

=== Bilgah ===
Bilgah (בִּלְגַה) was allocated the fifteenth division of priestly service when lots were drawn in 1 Chronicles 24.

=== Bilhan ===
Bilhan (בִּלְהָן "their decrepitude") was the name of 2 biblical individuals.

- A Horite chief dwelling in Mount Seir, a descendant of Esau (Genesis 36:27; 1 Chronicles 1:42).
- A Benjamite being the son of Jediael and father of Jeush, Benjamin, Ehud, Kenaanah, Zethan, Tarshish and Ahishahar (1 Chronicles 7:10).

=== Bilshan ===
Bilshan (בִּלְשָׁן), one of the important men who came with Zerubbabel from Babylon. (Ezra 2:2;Nehemiah 7:7) In 1 Esdras 5:8 he is called Beelsarus. According to Rabbinical Literature, the name Bilshan is improper, but a surname to the preceding name Mordecai. The latter was given this epithet because of his linguistic attainments.

=== Bimhal ===
Bimhal (בִּמְהָל) was one of the sons of Japhlet in the tribe of Asher (1 Chronicles 7:33).

=== Binea ===
Binea (בִּנְעָא "fountain"), a descendant of Jonathan, was the son of Moza and the father of Rephaiah or Rapha. He is mentioned in two passages: 1 Chronicles 8:37 and 1 Chronicles 9:43.

=== Binnui ===
Binnui (בִּנּוּי) was the name of 4 biblical individuals.

- A Levite, father of Noadiah and living in the time of Ezra (Ezra 8:33; Nehemiah 12:8).
- One of the descendants of Pahath-Moab guilty of intermarriage and Balnuus of 1 Esdras 9:31 (Ezra 10:30). He was also called Bani who was also mentioned being intermarried (Ezra 10:38).
- The son of Henadad who built the part of wall of Jerusalem; he also sealed the covenant with Nehemiah (Nehemiah 3:24; 10:9). He is identical with Bavvai son of Henadad mentioned in Nehemiah 3:18 which is either a corrupt version of Binnui. Or is a Levitical house which Bavvai was a chief. Nehemiah 10:9 supports this theory as Binnui is a leader and besides, the names in these verses are obviously of priests and Levites.
- One of the heads who went with Zerubbabel (Nehemiah 7:15; Ezra 2:10).

=== Birsha ===
Birsha (בִּרְשַׁע) is the king of Gomorrah in Genesis 14 who joins other Canaanite city kings in rebelling against Chedorlaomer.

=== Bishlam ===
Bishlam was one of the three foreign colonists who wrote a complaint letter concerning the Jews to Artaxerxes (Ezra 4:7). The Septuagint renders Bishlam as ἐν εἰρήνῃ (en eirēnē), "in peace", as though it were a phrase rather than a proper name; this is clearly or possibly an error. In 1 Esdras, his name is given as Belemus.

=== Biztha ===
Biztha was the second of the seven eunuchs of Ahasuerus; it may be possible that the name is derived from the Persian besteh, "bound," hence, "eunuch" (Esther 1:10).

=== Bocheru ===
Bocheru (בֹּכְרוּ "firstborn"), a Benjamite, was one of the 6 sons of Azel. He is mentioned two times in the Hebrew Bible: 1 Chronicles 8:38 and 1 Chronicles 9:44.

=== Bohan ===
Bohan (בֹּהַן "thumb") was mentioned in Joshua 15:6; 18:17 as whose stone served as a boundary mark from Judah to Benjamin. He is neither mentioned in the lists of Reuben's sons. Some suggest he was the one who set that rock.

=== Bukki ===
Bukki (בֻּקִּי) was the name of 2 biblical individuals.

- A prince of the tribe of Dan, son of Jogli; one of those appointed by Moses to superintend the division of Canaan amongst the tribe (Num. 34:22).
- A son of Abishua, father of Uzzi, and a priest from the line of Aaron (1 Chronicles 6:5,51; Ezra 7:4).

=== Bukkiah ===
Bukkiah (בֻּקִּיָּה "YHWH has emptied") was a Kohathite Levite being one of the sons of Heman one of the musicians of the first temple (1 Chronicles 25:4,13).

=== Bunah ===
Bunah (בּוּנָה "intelligence") is mentioned in 1 Chronicles 2:25 as a son of Jerahmeel, a Judahite.

=== Bunni ===
Bunni (בֻּנִּי) was the name of 2 biblical individuals.

- A Levite living in the time of described as "Standing on the stairs of the Levites were" (Nehemiah 9:4).
- The father of Hashabiah whose descendant, Shemaiah the Levite inhabited the newly recovered city Jerusalem (Nehemiah 11:15).

=== Buz ===
Buz (בּוּז) was the name of 2 biblical individuals.

- The second son of Nahor and Milcah (Genesis 22:21). Elihu, the Book of Job's antagonist was his prominent descendant (Job 32:2).
- One of the chiefs of the tribe of Gad (1 Chronicles 5:14).

=== Buzi ===
Buzi (Hebrew: בּוּזִי, Būzī) was the father of Ezekiel and priest of Jerusalem (Ezekiel 1:3). Ezekiel, like Jeremiah, is said to have been a descendant of Joshua by his marriage with the proselyte Rahab (Talmud Meg. 14b; Midrash Sifre, Num. 78).

== C ==
=== Calcol ===
See Chalcol

=== Caleb ===
This is about the Caleb mentioned only in 1 Chronicles 2:18. For the better-known Caleb son of Jephunneh, see Caleb.

=== Canaanitish Woman ===
The Canaanitish Woman can refer to one unnamed biblical individual.

- The mother of Shaul, son of Simeon. She was a Canaanite of Canaan whom Simeon was married to, it is unclear whether she was the mother of the other sons of Simeon (Genesis 46:10; Exodus 6:15).

=== Carkas ===
Carkas or Carcas is one of the seven eunuchs whom Ahasuerus summoned to parade queen Vashti (Esther 1:10).

=== Carmi ===
Carmi (כַּרְמִי "my vineyard") refers to two individuals mentioned in the Bible:

- The fourth son of Reuben and progenitor of the Carmites according to Genesis 46:9, Numbers 26:6, and 1 Chronicles 5:3.
- The son of Zabdi, grandson of Zerah of the Tribe of Judah, and the father of Achan, according to Joshua 7:1. He was present at the Battle of Jericho.

=== Carshena ===
Carshena or Karshena is a name which appears in a list of high-ranking officials of Persia and Media in the court of king Ahasuerus in Esther 1:14. It is derived from the Persian warkačīnā, meaning "wolfish".

=== Chalcol ===
Chalcol, the brother of Darda (Hebrew כלכל kalkol – the same consonants with different vowel points (kilkayl) mean "maintain") is listed in 1 Kings 4:31 as an example of a very wise man who is, nevertheless, not as wise as Solomon. Another person with the same Hebrew name (though spelled Calcol in the King James Version) is listed in 1 Chronicles as the son of Zerah, the son of Judah (son of Jacob).

=== Chelal ===
See Kelal.

=== Chelluh ===
Chelluh, Cheluhi, or Cheluhu (כְּלוּהַי "my accomplishment") is the name given in Ezra 10:35 for one of the men who married foreign women.

=== Chelub ===
Two individuals by the name of Chelub (כְּלוּב "caged") are mentioned in the Hebrew Bible.

- A descendant of Judah, called "brother of Shuhah" in 1 Chronicles 4:11, in a genealogical passage listing descendants of Judah. According to the Encyclopaedia Biblica (1899), this "Chelub" is the biblical figure better known as Caleb.
- An Ezri son of Chelub was an overseer of agricultural work in the time of king David according to 1 Chronicles 27:26.

=== Chelubai ===
See #Caleb

=== Chesed ===
See Kesed

=== Chenaanah ===
Chenaanah (Hebrew:כְּנַעֲנָה "trader") is the name of two biblical figures.

- In a genealogical section of Chronicles concerned with the Tribe of Benjamin, a Chenaanah son of Bilhan is mentioned.
- The false prophet Zedekiah is called "son of Chenaanah".

=== Chenani ===
Chenani (כְּנָנִי "my station") was one of the men mentioned in Nehemiah 9:4, in connection with the constitution of "congregation." If the names represent houses or families, eight Levitical houses probably sang some well-known psalm on this occasion.

=== Chenaniah ===
Chenaniah (כְּנַנְיָה), according to Chronicles, was a Levite leader in the time of David. The Hebrew text is unclear as to whether he was in charge of something to do with singing or with the carrying of the ark.

=== Cheran ===
Cheran or Keran (כְּרָן "lyre"), an Edomite, was the son of Dishon the Horite duke (Genesis 36:26; 1 Chronicles 1:41).

=== Chileab ===
Chileab (Hebrew: כִלְאָב, Ḵīləʾāḇ) also known as Daniel, was the second son of David, King of Israel, according to the Bible. He was David's son with his third wife Abigail, widow of Nabal the Carmelite, and is mentioned in 1 Chronicles 3:1, and 2 Samuel 3:3. Unlike the other of David's three elder sons, Amnon, Absalom, and Adonijah who were important characters in 2 Samuel, Chileab is only named in the list of David's sons and no further mention is made of him. Though being the second son,...

=== Chimham ===
Chimham, Chimhan or Kimham (כִּמְהָם "their longing") was a servant nominated by Barzillai to accompany King David to Gilgal during his return to Jerusalem from beyond the Jordan after the death of Absalom. (2 Samuel 19:37–40)

The name also refers to a place near Bethlehem where Johanan regrouped before departing to Egypt.

=== Chislon ===
Chislon (Hebrew: כִּסְלוֹן "confidence") was the father of Elidad, a prince of the Tribe of Benjamin. (Num. 34:21)

=== Col-hozeh ===
Col-hozeh (כׇּל־חֹזֶה "all-seeing") was the father of Shallum (Nehemiah 3:15), who was the official of Mizpah at the time, and head of the repairs to certain walls and fountains. He is further mentioned as the father of Baruch though it is not explicitly mentioned that Baruch's brother was Shallum, distinguishing this Col-hozeh from the previous (Nehemiah 11:5).

=== Conaniah ===
Conaniah, also Konaniah, (כּוֹנַנְיָהוּ "YHWH has established") was the name of two individuals:

- a Levite appointed with his brother, Shimei, by Hezekiah and Azariah the priest, to be the overseer to the tithes to the temple (2 Chronicles 31:12–13)
- a later Levite placed over the tithes in the time of Josiah (2 Chronicles 35:9).

=== Concubine, Aramitess ===
The concubine, Aramitess was the mother of Machir, the father of Gilead, she was the concubine of Ashriel (1 Chronicles 7:14).

=== Coz ===
Coz or Koz (קוֹץ) was the son of Helah and father of Anub and Hazzobebah (1 Chronicles 4:8).

=== Cushi ===
Cushi (כּוּשִׁי) was the name of 2 biblical individuals found in the Hebrew Bible.

- The father of Shelemiah, and so as the great-grandfather of Jehudi who later joined Jeremiah and Baruch in the request of the men to read the scrolls of Jeremiah to the king's direct advisors. Some point afterwards, Jehoiachim demolishes the scroll by casting it to a pit of fire. (Jeremiah 36:14)
- The father of the Prophet Zephaniah in Zephaniah 1:1; he was also the son of Gedaliah which was the son of Amariah the son of Hezekiah.

Another unnamed biblical figure called "the Cushite" is found in 2 Samuel 18:21 as a messenger from Joab who brought tidings to David, after the death of Absalom whom Joab killed. Shortly after David mourns for his beloved son. (2 Samuel 18:21–32) The King James Version translates his name as Cushi as a term for an Ethiopian descent.

== D ==
=== Dalaiah ===
See Delaiah

=== Dalphon ===
Dalphon (Hebrew דַּלְפוֹן "to weep") was one of the ten sons of Haman, killed along with Haman by the Jews of Persia, according to Esther 9:7.

=== Dara ===
See Darda

=== Darda ===
Darda (Hebrew דַּרְדַּע) was one of the exemplars of wisdom than whom Solomon was wiser. In 1 Chronicles 2:6, his name is misspelled as "Dara."

=== Darkon ===
Darkon (דַּרְקוֹן "scatterer") was the ancestor of his descendants who were among the servants of Solomon who returned with Zerubbabel (Ezra 2:56; Nehemiah 7:58).

=== Dathan ===
Dathan along with Korah and Abiram, being the son of Eliab rebelled against Moses (Numbers 16:1). He was sent to Sheol by Yahweh cause of his disobedience (Numbers 26:9).

=== Daughter of Machir ===
The Daughter of Machir was an unnamed biblical figure mentioned in 1 Chronicles 2:21, she was the daughter of Machir the son of Manasseh and one of the wives of Hezron who bore him Segub which became the father of Jair.

=== Daughter of Meshullam ===
The Daughter of Meshullam is an unnamed biblical individual whom Johanan, Tobiah's son married; her father was Meshullam (Nehemiah 6:18).

=== Daughter of Putiel ===
The Daughter of Putiel is an unnamed biblical individual whom Eleazar the son of Aaron married and bore him Phinehas (Exodus 6:25).

=== Daughter of Shechaniah ===
The Daughter of Shechaniah is a biblical figure unnamed and married to Tobiah, she was daughter to Shechaniah son of Arah, whom her father was widely respected; affecting her husband as feared (Nehemiah 6:18).

=== Daughter of Shuah ===
The Daughter of Shuah is an unnamed figure married to Judah, son of Jacob; she was the daughter of Shuah who bore Judah, Er, Onan and Shelah (Genesis 38:2). The reference to Judah's wife in Genesis 38:12 refers to her as the "daughter of Shuah", or "bat-Shuah" in Hebrew. This has led some to take Bat-Shuah (and variants) as her actual name. A midrashic tradition says her name was Aliyath. Bat-Shuah is also an alternative name for Bathsheba, wife of Judah's descendant, King David.

=== Debir ===
Debir was a king of Eglon, slain by Joshua and his valiant men, he camped before Gibeon and warred against it with the other kings, they hid in a cave and was hunged later (Joshua 18:1–26).

=== Deborah ===
Deborah appears in the Hebrew Bible as the wet nurse of Rebecca (Genesis 35:8). She is first mentioned by name in the Torah when she dies in a place called Alon Bachot (אלון בכות), "Tree of Weepings" (Genesis 35:8), and is buried by Jacob, who is returning with his large family to Canaan. According to Rashi, Deborah was sent by Laban to care for his sister Rebecca when the latter went to marry Isaac (Genesis 24:59).

=== Dedan ===
Dedan (Hebrew:דְּדָן) may refer to 2 biblical characters.

- A son of Raamah, son of Cush the son of Ham (Genesis 10:7; 1 Chronicles 1:9). His descendants is further mentioned in Isaiah 21:13, Ezekiel 27:15. They probably settled among the sons of Cush, on the northwest coast of the Persian Gulf (aka Arabian Gulf) and their descendants are likely among the Arabs of today.
- The son of Jokshan, the son of Abraham through Keturah and his sons, Leummim, Letushim and Asshurim (Genesis 25:3; 1 Chronicles 1:32).

=== Delaiah ===
Delaiah (דליהו "drawn out by YHWH"). is the name of several biblical persons:

- Kohenic family, one of the Twenty-four Priestly divisions
- Son of Shemaiah, and officer to King Jehoiakim of Judah. He was one of the officers present at the delivery of a scroll sent by Jeremiah, (Jer. 36:12) and one of those who asked the king not to burn the scroll. (ibid. 36:25)
- The head of a family that came up from the Babylonian exile with Zerubbabel, that was unable to give its ancestral genealogy. (Ezr. 2:60, Neh. 7:62)
- One of the sons of Elioenai, a descendant of the royal Davidic line through Jeconiah. (1 Chronicles 3:24). He lived after the exile and was a descendant of Zerubbabel as a 3x great-grandson.
- Son of Mehetabel and father of Shemaiah. (Neh. 6:10)

=== Deuel ===
Deuel (Hebrew דְּעוּאֵל) was the father of Eliasaph the leader of the Tribe of Gad, as noted in four verses in the Book of Numbers: Numbers 1:14; 7:42,47; 10:20. However, in Numbers 2:14 this Eliasaph is called "the son of Reuel."

=== Diblaim ===
Diblaim (Hebrew דִּבְלָיִם "cakes of pressed figs") was the father of the prophet Hosea's wife, Gomer. His name means 'doubled cakes'. (Hosea 1:3)

=== Dibri ===
Dibri, (דִּבְרִי "my word") a Danite, was the father of Shelomith, according to Leviticus 24:11. Shelomith's son was stoned to death by the people of Israel for blasphemy following Moses' issue of a ruling on the penalty to be applied for blasphemy.

=== Diklah ===
Diklah (דִּקְלָה "palm grove") was a son of Joktan according to Genesis 10:27, 1 Chronicles 1:21.

=== Dishan ===
Dishan (Hebrew דִּישׁוֹן dishon) was the youngest son of Seir the Horite. (Genesis 36:21)

=== Dishon ===
Dishon may refer to 2 biblical individuals.

- The fifth son of Seir (Genesis 36:21; 1 Chronicles 1:38). In the original of Ge 36:26, where his four sons are mentioned, the name is, by some transposition, DISHAN, which our translators (following the Sept. and the parallel passage 1Ch 1:41) have correctly changed to "Dishon."
- A child of Anah (Genesis 36:25; 1 Chronicles 1:41).

=== Dodavahu ===
Dodavahu or Dodavah (דּוֹדָוָהוּ "beloved of YHWH"), according to Chronicles, was a man of Mareshah in Judah and the father of Eliezer, a prophet who denounced Jehoshaphat's alliance with Ahaziah.

=== Dodo ===
Dodo (Hebrew דּוֹדוֹ dodo "his beloved" or "his uncle" from דּוֹד dod meaning "beloved" or "father's brother") is a name given to three persons in the Bible:

- A descendant of Issachar (Judges 10:1).
- An Ahohite, father of Eleazar, who was one of David's three mighty men who were over the thirty. (2 Samuel 23:9; 1 Chronicles 11:12)
- A man from Bethlehem, and father of Elhanan, who was one of David's thirty heroes (2 Samuel 23:24).

=== Dumah ===
Dumah (דּוּמָה "silence") was one of the sons of Ishmael (Genesis 25:14; 1 Chronicles 1:30). Some scholars identify Dumah with the ancient city of Duma in modern Saudi Arabia.

== E ==
=== Ebal ===
Ebal may refer to 2 biblical figures:

- A son of Shobal, a descendant of Seir the Horite, he was a relative to the Esauites in Genesis 36:23.
- See Obal

=== Ebed ===
- The father of Gaal, mentioned in Judges 9.
- The son of Jonathan, one of the heads of household who returned from the Babylonian exile in the Book of Ezra (Ezra 8:6).

=== Ebed-melech ===
Ebed-melech (Hebrew: עבד-מלך eved-melekh "servant of a king"), an Ethiopian eunuch, intervened with king Zedekiah on behalf of Jeremiah

=== Eber ===
Eber was the name of 5 biblical individuals of the Hebrew Bible.

- The third generation from Shem and the founder of the Hebrew race. The son of Salah and the father of Peleg. His named can be derived from the term Hebrew. (Genesis 10:24; 11:14)
- One of the seven heads of the descendants of Gad in 1 Chr 5:13.
- A benjaminite and the oldest of the three sons of Elpaal mentioned in 1 Chr 8:12.
- A benjaminite and one of the heads of the families of the tribe in Jerusalem. v.22
- A head of the family of Amok after the exile. (Nehemiah 12:20)

=== Ebiasaph ===
See Abiasaph

=== Eden ===
Eden may refer to the Garden of Eden or the singular person named Eden described in 2 Chr 29:12 as the son of Joah and one of the Levites who sanctified the Temple of the Lord by assisting in reforming the public worship of the sanctuary in the time of Hezekiah. In (2 Chronicles 31:15), Eden along with other people appointed, helped assisted Kore faithfully in the towns of the priests, distributing to their fellow priests according to their divisions, old and young alike.

=== Eder ===
Eder (Hebrew: עֶדֶר "flock") was a Benjaminite chief (Ader in the King James Version) (1 Chronicles 8:15)

=== Eglah ===
Eglah (Hebrew: עֶגְלָה) was one of David's wives and the mother of Ithream, according to 2 Samuel 3:5.

=== Ehi ===
In Genesis 46:21, Ehi is the third son of Benjamin. In 1 Chronicles 8:1 he is called Aharah, and in Numbers 26:38 he is called Ahiram.

=== Ehud ===
Ehud was one of the sons of Bilhan in a Benjamite clan (1 Chronicles 7:10).

=== Eker ===
Eker (Hebrew: עֵקֶר "offspring") was one of the sons of Ram the firstborn son of Jerahmeel the brother of Ram. He is mentioned in (1 Chronicles 2:27).

=== Eladah ===
Eladah (Hebrew: אֶלְעָדָה "God has adorned") was the son of Tahath and father of another Tahath, a descendant of Ephraim (1 Chronicles 7:20).

=== Elah ===
Elah is the name of 5 minor biblical individuals.

- Elah was the father of King Hoshea of Israel (2 Kings 17:1, 18:1)
- Elah was the name of an Edomite clan {the name of an eponymous chieftain} mentioned in Genesis 36:31–43.
- Elah was the second son of Caleb the son of Jephunneh (1 Chronicles 4:15).
- Elah was the father of Shimei comissary of Solomon (1 Kings 4:18).
- Elah was a Benjamite and son of one of the chiefs, Uzzi (1 Chronicles 9:8) Of the tribes where the country was settled.

=== Elasah ===
Elasah or Eleasah (Hebrew: אלעשה meaning 'made by God') was the name of four individuals mentioned in the Bible:

- The son of Shaphan, who was chosen by King Zedekiah of Judah to be one of the two messengers to take Jeremiah's letter to Nebuchadnezzar (Jeremiah 29:3) He was probably the brother of Ahikam, who had taken Jermiah's part at the time of his arrest after the temple sermon
- One of the sons of Pashur who was rebuked for marrying a foreign woman (Ezra 10:18–19)
- The son of Helez, a Jerahmeelite (1 Chronicles 2:39–40). He is called "Eleasah" in the King James Bible.
- A descendant of Saul according to 1 Chronicles 8:37. He is called "Eleasah" in the King James Bible.

=== Eldaah ===
Eldaah (Hebrew: אֶלְדָּעָה "God has known") appears as the last-named son or descendant of Midian, son of Abraham and Keturah, in Genesis 25:4 and 1 Chronicles 1:33.

=== Elead ===
Elead (Hebrew: אֶלְעָד "God has testified") appears in 1 Chronicles 7:21 as the name of a man who, along with his brother Ezer, is killed by farmers near Philistine the city of Gath. It is unclear whether Elead is intended by the Chronicler as the son or a later descendant of Ephraim, and it is likewise uncertain whether this Elead is the same figure as the Eleadah mentioned in the previous verse.

=== Eleasah ===
See Elasah.

=== Eliada ===
Eliada (rendered once as Eliadah by the King James Bible) is the name of three individuals in the Hebrew Bible.

- The son of David, who was originally called Beeliada.
- A Benjamite captain in the time of king Jehoshaphat.
- The father of Rezon the Syrian, spelled "Eliadah" in the King James Version.

=== Eliadah ===
See Eliada.

=== Eliezer ===
==== Eliezer, son of Dodavahu ====
See Dodavahu

=== Eliphal ===
Eliphal son of Ur is listed as one of David's Mighty Warriors in 1 Chronicles 11:35. In the corresponding place in Samuel's version of the list (2 Samuel 23:34), he is called "Eliphelet son of Ahasbai the Maachathite." According to the Encyclopaedia Biblica, the name "Eliphal" (Hebrew 'lypl) is copyist's error for "Eliphelet" ('lyplt) caused by dropping the final letter in the name.

=== Eliphelet ===
Eliphelet is a Hebrew name meaning "God is a deliverance." It is the name of several figures in the Hebrew Bible, and appears under several spellings.

- Eliphelet is the name given to a son of David in 2 Samuel 5:16, and 1 Chronicles 3:8 and 14:7. Due to a textual error, Chronicles records Eliphelet twice, as if it were the name of two different sons of David.
- Eliphal, son of Ur (2 Samuel 23:34) or Ahasbai (1 Chronicles 11:35), is listed as one of David's Mighty Warriors. The Encyclopaedia Biblica claims that "Eliphal" is likely a scribal error for "Eliphelet."
- Eliphal son of Eshek appears in a genealogy of the Tribe of Benjamin (1 Chronicles 8:39).
- An Eliphelet is named among the "descendants of Adonikam," one of the groups that returned with Ezra from the Babylonian captivity according to Ezra 8:13.
- An Eliphelet, one of the "descendants of Hashum," is listed as one of the men who married foreign women according to Ezra 10:33.

=== Eliasaph ===
Eliasaph was the name of two individuals mentioned in the Bible:

- The son of Deuel, the prince of the Tribe of Gad and one of the leaders of the tribes of Israel, according to Numbers 1:14 and Numbers 10:20.
- The son of Lael and the chief of the house of Gershon according to Numbers 3:24.

=== Eliathah ===
Eliathah (Hebrew: אֱלִיאָתָה "God has come") is the name given in 1 Chronicles 25:4 to one of the "fourteen sons" of Heman. According to 25:27, he gave his name to one of the twenty-four classes of temple singers.

=== Elidad ===
Elidad (Hebrew: אֱלִידָד "my God has loved") was a prince of the tribe of Benjamin; one of those appointed by Moses to superintend the division of Canaan amongst the tribe (Numbers 34: 21).

=== Elienai ===
Elienai, one of the nine sons of Shimei, appears in a genealogical passage as a descendant of Benjamin in 1 Chronicles 8:20. The consonants which make up the Hebrew name are only in this one passage read as Elienai; elsewhere the pronunciation is Elioenai.

=== Elihoreph ===
Elihoreph (Hebrew אליחרף) was a scribe in King Solomon's court. He was a son of Shisha and brother of Ahiah. (1 Kings: 4:3) The name means "'my God repays,' or 'my God is the giver of the autumn harvest.'"

=== Elijah ===
Elijah (Hebrew: אליה) was the name of three minor biblical individuals aside from the famous prophet Elijah.

- One of the sons of Jeroham according to 1 Chronicles 8:27.
- One of the descendants of the Harim, of the tribe of Levi who had married strange wives in the guiltiness of intermarriage. (Ezra 10:21)
- A descendant of Elam, of the priestly line who is also listed as being guilty of intermarriage in Ezra 10:26.

=== Elimelech ===
Elimelech (Hebrew: אֱלִימֶלֶךְ "my God is king") was the husband of Naomi. Together they had two sons, Mahlon and Chilion. He was originally a resident of Bethlehem before moving to Moab with his family, where he died (see Ruth 1:1–3). All of his property was later purchased by Boaz (see Ruth 4:9).

=== Elioenai ===
Elioenai is the name of several minor persons found in the Hebrew Bible.

- An Elioenai appears in 1 Chronicles 3:23–24: the son of Neariah, the son of Shemaiah, the son of Shecaniah, a descendant of king Jeconiah.
- A clan leader in the Tribe of Simeon, according to 1 Chronicles 4:36.
- Elioenai son of Becher, a descendant of the Tribe of Benjamin according 1 Chronicles 7:8.
- A descendant of Pashhur, one of the priests listed as having married foreign women (Ezra 10:22).
- A descendant of Zattu, also listed with those who had foreign wives (Ezra 10:27).
- A priest involved in the dedication of the wall of Jerusalem according to Nehemiah 12:41. This may be the same as the descendant of Passhur (above).
- Elioenai or Elihoenai, son of Meshelemiah, son of Korah; a temple gatekeeper (1 Chronicles 26:3).
- Elioenai or Elionenai was a descendant of David. He was the father of Akkub, and son of Neariah.

=== Elishama ===
Elishama (Hebrew: אלישמע my God heard) was the name of several biblical characters, including:

- Elishama, a son of Ammihud, a prince of the house of Ephraim and one of the leaders of the tribes of Israel, according to Numbers 1:10.
- Elishama the scribe (Jeremiah 36:12)
- Elishama, son of David, born in Jerusalem, mentioned in the second Book of Samuel (2 Samuel 5:16)

=== Elishaphat ===
Elishaphat (Hebrew: אֱלִישָׁפָט "my God has judged"), son of Zichri, was one of the "captains of hundreds" associated with Jehoiada in restoring king Jehoash to the throne 2 Chronicles 23:1.

=== Elisheba ===
Elisheba ("God is my oath", cognate to the name Elizabeth) is the wife of Aaron and sister-in-law of Moses. Her sons were Nadab, Abihu, Eleazer and Ithamar. (Exodus 6:23).

=== Elizaphan ===
Elizaphan was a prince of the tribe of Zebulun; one of those appointed by Moses to superintend the division of Canaan amongst the tribe (Num. 34:25).

=== Elizur ===
Elizur (Hebrew: אֱלִיצוּר) was a son of Shedeur and a prince of the House of Reuben according to Numbers 1:5, and one of the leaders of the tribes of Israel. He appears only in the Book of Numbers, in five verses (1:5; 2:10; 7:30, 35; 10:18).

=== Elnaam ===
Elnaam (Hebrew: אֶלְנַעַם), according to 1 Chronicles 11:46, was the father of Jeribai and Joshaviah, two of David's Mighty Warriors.

=== Elnathan ===
Elnathan (Hebrew אלנתן Elnathan "God gave") is a Hebrew name found in 2 Kings, Jeremiah and Ezra.

According to 2 Kings 24:8, Elnathan of Jerusalem was the father of Nehushta. Nehushta was the mother of King Jeconiah, whose father was King Jehoiakim. Despite this close relationship to the king, Elnathan was one of those who, according to Jeremiah 36:25 opposed Jehoiakim when he cut up and burnt a scroll that had been brought to him, containing Jeremiah's prophesies of the forthcoming destruction of Judah. Elnathan's father Achbor was a strong supporter of the earlier reforms of King Josiah, which may have influenced Elnathan's behavior, although according to Jeremiah 26:20–23 he had earlier been closely involved in the persecution of the prophet Uriah ben Shemaiah.

In Ezra 8:16, the name Elnathan occurs three times:

Then sent I for Eliezer, for Ariel, for Shemaiah, and for Elnathan, and for Jarib, and for Elnathan, and for Nathan, and for Zechariah, and for Meshullam, chief men; also for Joiarib, and for Elnathan, which were teachers. (Revised Version)

Donna Laird proposes that the repetition of "Elnathan", and the similarity between the names "Jarib" and "Joiarib", indicate a copyist's accidental repetition.

=== Elon ===
Elon (Hebrew: אֵילֹן, Modern: Elon, Tiberian: 'Êlōn, "Oak") was the name of two individuals mentioned in the Bible:

- A son of Zebulun according to Genesis 46:14 and Numbers 26:26. He was one of the 70 souls to migrate to Egypt with Jacob.
- Elon, one of the judges of Israel.

=== Elpaal ===
Elpaal (Hebrew: אֶלְפַּעַל "God is maker") is a name mentioned briefly in 1 Chronicles 8, in a genealogy of the Tribe of Benjamin. He is recorded as the son of a woman named Hushim, the wife of a man named Shaharaim. The relationship between Shaharaim and Benjamin is not spelled out by the Chronicler. Elpaal is recorded as the father of people who included the builders or ancestors of the towns of Ono, Lod, and Ajalon.

=== Elpalet ===
See Eliphelet (biblical figure)

=== Elpelet ===
See Elpelet

=== Eluzai ===
Eluzai (Hebrew: אֶלְעוּזַי), in 1 Chronicles 12:6, is the name of a Benjamite warrior who joined the forces of David at Ziklag. The name may have meant "God is my refuge."

=== Elzabad ===
Elzabad is the name of two biblical figures.

- Elzabad appears ninth in a list of eleven warriors from the Tribe of Gad who, according to 1 Chronicles 12:12, joined forces with David "at the stronghold in the wilderness."
- Elzabad, the son of Shemaiah, the son of Obed-edom, is listed as a Korahite porter in 1 Chronicles 26:7.

=== Elzaphan ===
Elzaphan was a son of Uzziel of the house of Levi according to Exodus 6:22, born in Egypt. He was a nephew of Amram and a cousin of Aaron, Miriam, and Moses. He and Mishael were asked by Moses to carry away Nadab's and Abihu's bodies to a place outside the camp. (Leviticus 10:4). In the wilderness of Sinai he was named chief of the house of Kohath (Numbers 3:30).

=== Enan ===
For the place-name containing Enan, see Hazar Enan.

Enan (Hebrew: עֵינָן "having eyes") is mentioned several by way of reference to his son, "Ahira the son of Enan," who according to the Book of Numbers was the tribal leader of the Tribe of Naphtali in the time of the wilderness wanderings following the Exodus.

=== Enoch ===
In Genesis 4:17–18, Enoch is the firstborn son of Cain and the father of Irad. Cain named the city of Enoch after his son.

=== Ephlal ===
Ephlal (Hebrew: אֶפְלָל "intercessor") is the name given to a Jerahmeelite found a genealogy in 1 Chronicles. He is identified as the son of Zabad, the son of Nathan, the son of Attai, the son of Jarha, the son-in-law of Sheshan, the son of Ishi, the son of Appaim, the son of Nadab, the son of Shammai, the son of Onam, the son of Jerahmeel. In various manuscripts of the Greek Septuagint, the name is found in the forms Aphamel, Aphamed, and Ophlad. Stanley Arthur Cook (1899) suggested that the name might originally have been either an abbreviated form of Eliphelet, or else the name "Elpaal."

=== Ephod ===
Ephod was the father of Hanniel, a prince of the Tribe of Manasseh. (Num. 34:23).

=== Ephron ===
Ephron the Hittite, son of Zohar, lived in Mamre among the children of Heth. Abraham came to the Hittites, who were strangers to him, and asked them to sell him a property that he could use as a burial site for Sarah, his wife. The Hittites, flattering Abraham by calling him a mighty prince, said that he could choose whichever tomb he wanted. Abraham then asked his hosts to contact Ephron, son of Zohar, who owned a field where the cave of Machpelah was located, which he was offering to buy for "the full price". Ephron slyly replies that he is prepared to give Abraham the field and the cave within, knowing that that would not result in Abraham having a permanent claim on it. Abraham politely refuses the offer and insists on paying for the field. Ephron replies that the field is worth four hundred shekels of silver, and Abraham agrees to the price without any further bargaining. He then proceeded to bury Sarah there.

=== Er ===
Er (Hebrew: ער Observant) was the name of several biblical characters, including:

- A descendant of Shelah, son of Judah (son of Jacob) in 1 Chronicles 4:21.
- The son of Joshua and father of Eliadah.

=== Eran ===
Eran (Hebrew: עֵרָן, romanized: /ˌɛrˈɑːn/ err-AHN, lit. 'vigilant') was a son of Shuthelah of the Tribe of Ephraim, according to Numbers 26:36.

=== Eri ===
In Genesis 46:16 Eri (עֵרי "watchful") is the son of Gad. He was the progenitor of the Erites. (Numbers 26:16)

=== Eshek ===
Eshek (Hebrew: עֵשֶׁק) is a name which appears only once in the Hebrew Bible, in a genealogy of the Tribe of Benjamin. The text of Chronicles identifies him as the brother of Azel.

=== Ethnan ===
Ethnan (Hebrew: אֶתְנַן), the son of Ashur the father of Tekoa, is a figure who appears in a genealogy of the Tribe of Judah in 1 Chronicles 4:7. He may be included in the genealogy to represent Ithnan, a Judahite city mentioned in Joshua 15:23.

=== Ethni ===
See Ethni.

=== Evi ===
Evi (אֱוִי "my desire") was one of five Midianite kings killed during the time of Moses by an Israelite expedition led by Phinehas, son of Eleazar according to Numbers 31:8 and Joshua 13:21.

=== Ezbon ===
Ezbon is the name of two people mentioned in the Bible:

- A son of Gad (Genesis 46:16). In Numbers 26:16 his name is given as Ozni, whose descendants constitute the Oznite clan.
- A grandson of Benjamin (1 Chr. 7:7).

=== Ezer ===
- Ezer, son of Seir the Horite (Genesis 36:21, 1 Chronicles 1:38) and the father of Jaakan or Akan (Genesis 36:27, 1 Chronicles 1:42)
- Ezer, son of Ephraim, who was slain by inhabitants of Gath (1 Chronicles 7:21)
- Ezer, son of Jeshua and ruler of Mizpah, who aided in repairing the wall of Jerusalem (Nehemiah 3:19)

=== Ezrah ===
Ezrah is the father of Jether, Mered, Epher and Jalon, grandfather (through Mered) of Miriam, Shammai and Ishbah, and great-grandfather (through Ishbah) of Eshtemoa (1 Chr. 4:17)

== G ==
=== Gad ===
Gad, is mentioned as a prophet of David in Samuel 22 and 24. In 1 Chronicles 21 he is a seer who kept a chronicle of David's acts. 2 Chronicles 29:25 mentions Nathan as David's prophet and Gad as his seer.

=== Gaddi ===
Gaddi (גַּדִּי "my fortune"), the son of Susi of the House of Manasseh, was a scout sent to Canaan prior to the crossing of the Jordan River according to Numbers 13:11.

=== Gaddiel ===
Gaddiel (גַּדִּיאֵל "God is my fortune"), the son of Sodi of the house of Zebulun, was a scout sent to Canaan prior to the crossing of the Jordan River according to Numbers 13:10.

=== Gaham ===
Gaham (גַּחַם "burning"), was the second son of Nahor through his concubine, Reumah. Nothing else is known about this individual except for a certain genealogy in Genesis 22:24.

=== Gamaliel ===
Gamaliel (גַּמְלִיאֵל "reward of God"), son of Pedahzur was leader of the tribe of Manasseh, one of the leaders of the tribes of Israel, mentioned several times in the Book of Numbers.

=== Gamul ===
Gamul (Hebrew: גָמוּל; "rewarded" or "recompense") was head of the twentieth of twenty-four priestly divisions instituted by King David.

=== Gatam ===
Gatam (גַּעְתָּם "a burnt valley") is a name which appears in Genesis and Chronicles in a genealogy of the Edomites. In Genesis 36:11 and 1 Chronicles 1:36, Gatam is described the "son" of Eliphaz, the son of Esau (who is according to the Bible the forefather of the Edomites). In the passages which describe Gatam as a "son" of Eliphaz, he is listed alongside his "brothers": Teman, Omar, Zepho, and Kenaz according to Genesis; a similar but slightly larger list of brothers in Chronicles (Chronicles includes Amalek as a brother of Gatam). However, in Genesis 36:16, Gatam and Amalek (along with a previously unmentioned Korah) are described not as individual sons but as "clans" of Eliphaz.

=== Gazez ===
In the Masoretic Text of the Hebrew Bible, two individuals by the name of Gazez (גָּזֵז) appear in 1 Chronicles 2:46. The New International Version reads:

Caleb’s concubine Ephah was the mother of Haran, Moza and Gazez. Haran was the father of Gazez.

However, the Peshitta includes only one Gazez, and at least one biblical scholar has suggested that the second Gazez may have been included in the Masoretic Text by mistake.

=== Geber ===
Geber (Hebrew: גבר, geber), son of Uri, was one of King Solomon's regional administrators; his territory was Gilead.

=== Gemalli ===
Gemalli (גְּמַלִּי) of the house of Dan was the father of Ammiel, a scout sent to Canaan prior to the crossing of the Jordan River according to Numbers 13:4.

=== Gemariah ===
Gemariah (Hebrew: גמריה) is the name of at least two biblical characters:

- Gemariah son of Shaphan in chapter 36 of Jeremiah. His own son Micaiah hears Jeremiah's secretary Baruch read Jeremiah's prophecies against the nation, and reports to a meeting of the court officials, including his father, nearby. This leads to the scroll being read before king Jehoiakim, who cuts it up and burns it despite the protestations of Gemariah and Elnathan ben Achbor.
- Gemariah son of Hilkiah, one of the envoys whom King Zedekiah sent to Babylonia (Jeremiah 29:3) Nothing else is known of him; he was hardly the brother of Jeremiah, whose father was also named Hilkiah.

=== Genubath ===
Genubath (Hebrew: גנבת genubat "Stolen") is mentioned in 1 Kings 11:20 as the son born to Hadad the Edomite and the sister of Queen Tahpenes, Pharaoh's wife.

=== Gera ===
Hebrew: גרא Gera'

- In Genesis 46:21 Gera is the fourth of ten sons of Benjamin.
- Gera is also the name of the father of Shimei (2 Samuel 19:16)
- Gera is also the name of two of the sons of Bela (see above), making both nephews of the earlier Gera. (1 Chronicles 8:3,5)
- Gera is also the name of the father of Ehud, a "Benjamite, a man left-handed" – Book of Judges, 3:15.

=== Geuel ===
Geuel (גְּאוּאֵל "majesty of God"), the son of Machi of the Tribe of Gad, was a scout sent to Canaan prior to the crossing of the Jordan River according to Numbers 13:15.

=== Ginath ===
Ginath (גִּינַת "protection") is a name which is mentioned only in passing in a narrative describing the struggle for kingship between Omri and Tibni. Tibni is referred to in 1 Kings 16:21 and 22 as "son of Ginath," which taken literally, could be read as implying that a person named Ginath was Tibni's father. However, the Encyclopaedia Biblica suggests that the term "Ginath" is a place-name or clan-name, so that "Tibni son of Ginath" has the meaning "Tibni of Ginath."

=== Gideoni ===
Gideoni (Hebrew: גִּדְעֹנִי) was a member of the tribe of Benjamin according to Numbers 1:11. He was the father of Abidan, a tribal chief. He is mentioned five times in the Book of Numbers, with each reference stating his relation to Abidan (Num 1:11, Num 2:22, Num 7:60, Num 7:65, Num 10:24.) His name is variously understood as meaning "one with a disabled hand," "a youth," or "one who cuts down trees."

=== Giddalti ===
Giddalti (גִּדַּלְתִּי "I make great") was one of the sons of Heman the Levite (1 Chronicles 25:4), and chief of the twenty-two division of the temple musicians 1 Chronicles 25:29. He was also a Kohathite Levi.

=== Gilalai ===
Gilalai (גִּלֲלַי "weighty") is the name of a priest who participated as a musician in a procession led by Ezra.

=== Ginnethoi ===
Ginnethoi or Ginnethon (Hebrew גִּנְּתוֹן 'Ginnĕtôi' Meaning: gardener) was one of the priests who sealed the covenant according to Nehemiah 10:6 and perhaps the same as in Nehemiah 12:16.

=== Gishpa ===
Gishpa, (KJV Gispa Hebrew: גִּשְׁפָּא) was one of two leaders of the Nethinim who lived in Ophel, according to Nehemiah 11:21. There are no other mentions of the name anywhere else in the Bible.

=== Gog ===
Gog (Hebrew: גּ֥וֹג) the Reubenite (separate from Gog and Magog), is the son of Shema, father of Shimei 1 Chronicles 5:4.

=== Guni ===
Guni (גּוּנִי) was a son of Naphtali according to Genesis 46:24 and Numbers 26:48. He was one of the 70 people to migrate to Egypt with Jacob according to the narrative.

== H ==
=== Haahashtari ===
Haahashtari or Ahashtari was one of the sons of Naarah, one of the two wives of Asshur (1 Chronicles 4:6). Because the name is used to refer to a family of Judahites who descend from Judah via Ashhur, Thomas Kelly Cheyne believed that the name "Haahashtari" arose from a confusion between Ha-Ashhuri ("the Ashhurite") with the obscure term ahashtranim which appears in Esther 8:10.

=== Habaiah ===
Habaiah (also called Hobaiah or Obdia) was the name given to a priestly family mentioned in Ezra 2:61: the b'ne habayah (literally "sons/descendants of Habaiah"). Along with the families Hakkoz and Barzillai, the Habaiah family were priests whose names were not registered in the official genealogical records. As a result, Ezra ruled that their rights to serve as priests would be restricted until such time as a high priest could decide, using the oracular Urim and Thummim, whether they had divine approval to serve as priests.

The name "Habaiah" means "Yahweh hides" or "Yahweh protects," and appears in manuscripts of the Greek Septuagint in the forms Labeia, Obaia, Odogia, Ebeia, Ab(e)ia, Obbeia, and Obdia.

=== Habazziniah ===
Habazziniah or Habaziniah (חֲבַצַּנְיָה) was either the head of a family of Rechabites (Jeremiah 35:3), or else a place name for the location that a Rechabite lived. According to Cheyne and Black, it may have been a scribal error where the name "Kabzeel," a place in the territory of Judah, was originally intended."

=== Hachmoni ===
Hachmoni or Hakmoni (חַכְמוֹנִי) is mentioned in passing in 1 Chronicles 27:32, which records that his son Yechiel, a scribe, tutored David's sons.

=== Hadadezer ===
According to I Kings 11:23, Hadadezer (Hebrew: הדדעזר hadad'ezer "Hadad helps") was king of Zobah.

=== Haddad ===
Hadad the Edomite was an adversary of Solomon (1 Kings 11:14).

=== Hadlai ===
Hadlai (חַדְלַי "rest of God") is mentioned in 2 Chronicles 28:12 as an Ephraimite, and the father of Amasa. In manuscripts of the Greek Septuagint, his name is given as Choab, Addi, or Adli.

=== Hagab ===
Hagab (also Agaba, Accaba) (Hebrew: חָגָב "locust") is identified as the ancestor of a family of Nethinim, or temple assistants, who returned from the Babylonian exile. They appear in a list with other returnees in Ezra 2:46, but are omitted in the corresponding place in Nehemiah 7:48. A Hellenized version of this name appears in a similar context in 1 Esdras 5:30. In the New Testament, a prophet who appears in Acts 11:28 and 21:10 is named Agabus, a variant on the name Hagab.

Hagab is a different character from Hagabah, which appears in the preceding verse.

=== Hagabah ===
Hagabah (also Hagaba, Graba, or Aggaba) (Hebrew:חֲגָבָא) is identified as the ancestor of a family of Nethinim, or temple assistants, who returned from the Babylonian captivity. They appear in a list with other returnees in Ezra 2:45, Nehemiah 7:48, and 1 Esdras 5:29.

=== Haggiah ===
Haggiah (חַגִּיָּה "festival of YHWH"), of the tribe of Levi through Merari, is described in 1 Chronicles 6:30 being the son of Shimea and the father of Asaiah, one of the last contemporaries of David.

=== Haggi ===
Haggi (חַגִּי "festive") was a son of Gad according to Genesis 46:16 and Numbers 26:15. He was one of the 70 persons to migrate to Egypt with Jacob.

=== Hajehudijah ===
See Jehudijah.

=== Hakkatan ===
Hakkatan (also Acatan, Akatan), meaning "the small one," is listed as the father of Johanan, a leader of the descendants of Azgad in Ezra 8:12 and 1 Esdras 8:38. Other than these two verses, the name Hakkatan appears nowhere in the Bible.

=== Hakkoz ===
Hakkoz (הַקּוֹץ) is the name of two or three biblical individuals:

- Head of the seventh of twenty-four priestly divisions created by King David. (1 Chr. 24:10)
- Head of a family of priests after the Babylonian exile. Unable to prove their lineage, the family lost its priesthood status. (Ezr. 2:61, Neh. 7:63)
- Father of Uriah and grandfather of Meremoth, who assisted Nehemiah in rebuilding the walls of Jerusalem. (Neh. 3:4, 3:21) He is probably identical to the previous entry.

=== Hallohesh ===
Hallohesh or Halohesh is a name which is used twice in the Bible. In a list of workers building the wall of Nehemiah, a man named "Shallum son of Hallohesh" is mentioned as having a leadership role. Also in the Book of Nehemiah, a person named Hallohesh is recorded as affixing his seal (an ancient form of signature) to Ezra's covenant between God and the people living around Jerusalem.

Thomas Kelly Cheyne believed that the name Hallohesh was a miswritten version of the name Hash-shilhi, (Shilhi).

=== Hammedatha ===
Hammedatha was an Agagite and the father of Haman (see Esther 3:1).

=== Hammoleketh ===
Hammoleketh or Hammolecheth is the sister of Machir, the eponymous ancestor of the tribe or clan of Machir, which is reckoned as a part of the tribe of Manasseh in 1 Chronicles 7. The name appears to mean "she who reigns" if it is not a scribal error for some other name, such as Beth-Milcah.

=== Hammelech ===
Hammelech, in the King James Version is the name of the father of Jerahmeel (Jeremiah 36:26), and it is the name of the father of Malkijah (Jeremiah 38:6). In a number of more recent translations, the Hebrew ha-melekh is taken as the common noun "the king" instead of the proper noun "Hammelech."

=== Hamor ===
Hamor (חֲמוֹר "he-ass") was the father of Shechem. Shechem defiled Dinah, according to Genesis 34

=== Hamul ===
Hamul (חָמוּל "spared") was a son of Pharez of the Tribe of Judah according to Genesis 46:12 and Numbers 26:21. He was one of the 70 souls to migrate to Egypt with Jacob.

=== Hamutal ===
Hamutal (חֲמוּטַל "father-in-law is protection") was the daughter of Jeremiah of Libnah and, the wife of King Josiah who bore him Jehoahaz and Zedekiah. She is mentioned in the following passages: 2 Kings 23:31, 2 Kings 24:18 and Jeremiah 52:1.

=== Hanameel ===
Hanameel or Hanamel (Hebrew: חנמאל, which means "Grace From God"), a cousin of Jeremiah from whom the latter bought a field at Anathoth in Jeremiah 32:5–16.

=== Hananiah ===
Hananiah (Hebrew: חנניה, which means "My Grace is the Lord") is the name of several biblical characters:

- Hananiah son of Zerubbabel, the father of Jeshaiah, was a descendant of David.
- Hananiah son of Azur, a prophet in the time of king Zedekiah. He prophesied a return from the exile in Babylon within two years and was denounced by Jeremiah as a false prophet as a result. He died within a year of the denunciation.
- Hananiah, appointed by Nehemiah, jointly with Hanani, to be responsible for the security of Jerusalem after its walls had been rebuilt. Nehemiah described him as "a faithful man [who] feared God more than many".

=== Hanniel ===
Hanniel (חַנִּיאֵל) Prince of the tribe of Manasseh; one of those appointed by Moses to superintend the division of Canaan amongst the tribe (Num. 34:23).

=== Hanoch ===
Hanoch (חֲנוֹךְ "dedicated") is the name of two biblical figures:

1. A son of Midian, the eponymous forefather of the Midianites.
2. A son of Reuben, the eponymous forefather of the Tribe of Reuben.

According to Cheyne and Black, the presence of this clan name in the genealogies of Reuben and Midian may indicate that the clan Hanoch was considered a part of the Tribe of Reuben but had a Midianite origin.

=== Happizzez ===
Happizzez or Aphses (הַפִּצֵּץ) was a priest who fell on the eighteenth lot out of the twenty-four lots ordained by David for the temple service. (1 Chr 24:15)

=== Haran ===
Haran or Aran refers to three minor characters in the Hebrew Bible:

1. Haran (Hebrew: הָרָן – Hārān), son of Terah, from Ur of the Chaldees. He fathered Lot, Milcah and Iscah. (Genesis 11:27–29)
2. Haran (Hebrew: חָרָן – Ḥārān), son of Caleb, a descendant of Jacob, and Ephah his mother. Father of 1.Gazez, and brother of 2.Gazez. (1 Chronicles 2:46)
3. Haran (Hebrew: הָרָן – Hārān), son of Shimei, a Levite who lived in the age of King David and played one of the important religious or political roles set out in 1 Chronicles 23:1–9.

=== Harbona ===
Harbona or Harbonah is the name given for one of the eunuchs of king Ahasuerus in Esther 1:10 and 7:9.

=== Hareph ===
Hareph (חָרֵף "a plucking off"), according to 1 Chronicles 2:51, was a descendant of Caleb and the father of Beth-gader. The name "Hareph" in this case may refer to a group of people otherwise referred to by the term Hariphite.

=== Harhaiah ===
Harhaiah (חַרְהֲיָה "fear of YHWH"), in the Masoretic Text of Nehemiah 3:8, is mentioned in passing, as being the father of Uzziel, a man responsible for the repair of part of the wall of Jerusalem. The awkward phrasing of the verse suggested to Stanley A. Cook (1899) that there had been some scribal mishandling of the verse, and that the verse originally did not contain the name "Harhaiah."

=== Harhas ===
Harhas, according to 2 Kings 22:14 and 2 Chronicles 34:22, was an ancestor of Shallum, the husband of the prophetess Huldah. However, where the Book of Kings has "Harhas," the Book of Chronicles reads "Hasrah."

=== Harim ===
Harim (Hebrew: חָרִם; "destroyed" or "dedicated to God") was the name of three biblical patriarchs:

- Head of the third of twenty-four priestly divisions instituted by King David. (1 Chr. 24:8)
- Head of a non-priestly family, with 320 members, which returned with Zerubbabel. (Ezr. 2:32, Neh. 7:35) Eight members of this family were found to have married gentile women, whom they divorced. (Ezr. 10:31) Harim's son Malchijah was one of those who helped repair the walls of Jerusalem, including the Tower of the Furnaces. (Neh. 3:11) His seal was on the renewed covenant with God made by the Babylonian returnees. (Neh. 10:28)
- Head of a priestly family, with 1017 members, which returned with Zerubbabel. (Ezr. 2:39, Neh. 7:42) Five members of this family were found to have married gentile women, whom they divorced. (Ezr. 10:21) His seal was also on the renewed covenant. (Neh. 10:6) The head of his family at the time of the return was Adna. (Neh. 12:152)

=== Harnepher ===
Harnepher appears only once in the Bible, in 1 Chronicles 7:36, in a passage which surveys the descendants of Asher. The name may be of Egyptian origin, meaning "Horus is good."

=== Harum ===
Harum (הָרֻם "exalted") is recorded as the father of Aharhel in 1 Chronicles 4:8, which lists him as an ancestor of several clans in the Tribe of Judah.

=== Harumaph ===
Harumaph (חֲרוּמַף "split nose") is listed as the father of Jedaiah, a man responsible for making repairs to a part of Nehemiah's wall. He is only mentioned once in the Bible, in Nehemiah 3:10.

=== Haruz ===
Haruz (Hebrew: חרוז) was the father of Queen Meshullemeth. According to 2 Kings 21:19 he was a citizen who dwelt in the land of Jotbah.

=== Hasadiah ===
Hasadiah (Hebrew: חֲסַדְיָה "Jehovah has been faithful") is listed as one of the sons of Zerubabel in 1 Chronicles 3:20, and is therefore a member of the royal lineage of the Judahite kings.

=== Hashabiah ===
Hashabiah (חֲשַׁבְיָה) is a biblical name which appears frequently for individuals mentioned both before and after the Babylonian captivity.

Because the name often appears in lists without any detailed description, it is sometimes difficult to tell whether different verses that use the name are referring to the same Hashabiah or to distinct persons. The following list of nine individuals is the number listed in the Encyclopaedia Biblica, although the encyclopedia does not claim that precisely nine people of this name are mentioned:

1. A Levite of the Merarite group, mentioned 1 Chronicles 6:45 (verse 30 in some Bibles).
2. Hashabiah son of Bunni, a Merarite Levite listed as living in Jerusalem in 1 Chronicles 9:14 and Nehemiah 11:15.
3. A leader of a large group of people in the time of David.
4. A musician, one of the musicians appointed by David for the musical service of the Temple.
5. Hashabiah son of Kemuel, identified as the leader of the Levites in the time of David.
6. A Levite leader in the time of Josiah.
7. A Levite identified as having signed the covenant between Ezra and God.
8. A ruler listed as one of the people responsible for repairing the wall of Jerusalem in Nehemiah 3:17.
9. The ruler of the clan of Hilkiah, according to Nehemiah 12:21.

=== Hashabnah ===
Hashabnah (חֲשַׁבְנָה) is the name given for one of the men who signed the covenant between the people of Judah and God in Nehemiah 10:25 (verse 26 in some Bibles). According to Cheyne and Black, the name is likely a miswritten form of "Hashabniah."

=== Hashub ===
Hashub (חַשּׁוּב) is mentioned in passing as the father of Shemaiah, a Levite who is listed among those living in Jerusalem after the end of the Babylonian captivity.

=== Hashubah ===
Hashubah (חֲשֻׁבָה "consideration") is listed as one of the children of Zerubabel, the governor of Yehud Medinata.

=== Hasrah ===
Hasrah, according to 2 Chronicles 34:22, is the name of an ancestor of Shallum, the husband of the prophetess Huldah. However, where the Book of Chronicles has "Hasrah", 2 Kings 22:14 has "Harhas".

=== Hassenaah ===
The sons of Hassenaah (הַסְּנָאָה) built the Fish Gate during the reconstruction of the walls of Jerusalem under the repair programme led by Nehemiah.

=== Hasupha ===
Hasupha (Hashupha in the King James Version) (Hebrew: חֲשׂוּפָא "stripped") is the name of a clan or family of Nethinim (temple assistants) returning from exile in the 1st caravan listed in Nehemiah 7:46 and Ezra 2:43.

=== Hathach ===
Hathach or Hatach is the name of one of the eunuchs of Ahasuerus in the Book of Esther. He acts as a messenger between Esther and Mordecai.

=== Hathath ===
Hathath (חֲתַת "fearful") is only mentioned in 1 Chronicles 4:13, in a genealogical passage where he is the son of Othniel, the son of Kenaz (brother of Caleb).

=== Hattil ===
The descendants of Hattil (also called Agia or Hagia) (Hebrew:חַטִּיל "doubtful") are listed in Ezra 2:57 and Nehemiah 7:59 as a group of people returning from the Babylonian captivity (see Ezra–Nehemiah). They are categorized by Ezra as being descendants of "Solomon's servants" (see Nethinim). In the Greek text of 1 Esdras 5:34, a closely related work, Hattil is referred to as Agia or Hagia.

=== Hazaiah ===
Hazaiah (חֲזָיָה "God has seen") is a figure mentioned in passing in Nehemiah 11:5 as an ancestor Maaseiah, a notable leader of the Tribe of Judah in Yehud Medinata.

=== Hazo ===
Hazo(חֲזוֹ "vision") was the fifth son of Nahor and Milcah (Genesis 22:22).

=== Heber ===
Heber or Chéver (Hebrew: חֶבֶר / חָבֶר, Modern Ḥéver / Ḥáver Tiberian Ḥéḇer / Ḥāḇer, "friend", "connected") is a name referring to two persons.

- The Kenite husband of Jael, the biblical heroine who killed Sisera (Book of Judges 4:11, 4:17–22). ,
- The grandson of the patriarch Asher mentioned at Genesis 46:17 and in Numbers 26:45. Heber probably should not be confused with the Eber who was Abraham's ancestor.

=== Hebron ===
Hebron: see 1 Chronicles 2:42–43

=== Helah ===
Helah (חֶלְאָה "rust") was one of the two wives of Ashur the son of Hezron mentioned in 1 Chronicles 4:5. Ashur's sons through Helah his wife were: Zereth, Jezoar and Ethnan.

=== Heldai ===
Heldai is the name of two biblical figures. According to the Encyclopaedia Biblica, it should most likely be given alternate vowels as Holdai or Huldai.

1. Heldai son of Baanah the Netophathite is listed as one of David's Mighty Warriors, and also in a list of military leaders given in 1 Chronicles 27:15. He is called "Heled" in 1 Chronicles 11:30, and "Heleb" in 2 Samuel 23:29.
2. A Jew living in Babylonia, mentioned in Zechariah 6:10. He is called Helem in Zechariah 6:14.

=== Helek ===
Helek(חֵלֶק "portion") was a son of Gilead of the Tribe of Manasseh according to Numbers 26:30 and Joshua 17:2.

=== Helez ===
There are two biblical figures named Helez (חֶלֶץ "he has saved"):

- A Jerahmeelite; the father of Eleasah and the son of Azariah mentioned in (1 Chronicles 2:39).
- An Ephraimite, one of the 30 of David's mighty warriors, and a captain in the seventh month mentioned in (1 Chronicles 27:10).

=== Helkai ===
Helkai (חֶלְקַי "my portion is YHWH") is a name used in Nehemiah 12:15, in a list of priestly clan leaders in the "days of Joiakim." The text refers to Helkai as leading a clan named Meraioth. According to the Encyclopaedia Biblica, the name is an abbreviated form of "Hilkiah."

=== Helon ===
Helon (חֵלֹן "strength") was a member of the house of Zebulun according to Numbers 1:9. He was the father of Eliab.

=== Hemam ===
Hemam or Homam is the name of the son of Lotan and grandson of Seir the Horite, according to Genesis 36:22 and 1 Chronicles 1:39.

=== Henadad ===
Henadad (חֵנָדָד "favor of Hadad") is a biblical name which appears only in Ezra–Nehemiah. In a passage which describes the rebuilding of the wall of Jerusalem, two "sons of Henadad", Bavai and Binnui, are named as taking responsibility for portions of the wall. Binnui reappears later, where he is described as a Levite and as one of the signatories of the covenant between Ezra, God, and the people of Judah. The "sons of Henadad," though without any specific individuals named, are mentioned in also in Ezra 3:9, a "difficult passage".

=== Hepher ===
Hepher (חֵפֶר) was a son of Manasseh according to Numbers 26:32 and Joshua 17:2. See List of minor biblical places § Hepher.

=== Heresh ===
Heresh (חֶרֶשׁ "mute"), along with Galal, Mattaniah and Bakbakkar, was a Levite and a descendant of Asaph described in 1 Chronicles 9:15 as one who returned from Babylon.

=== Hezekiah ===
Hezekiah is the name of three minor figures in the Hebrew Bible. In some Bibles the variant spellings Hizkiah and Hizkijah occur.

- A son of Neariah and descendant of David mentioned in the royal genealogy of 1 Chronicles 3.
- A figure mentioned in passing in Ezra 2:16 and Nehemiah 7:21, as the ancestor of some of the exiles who returned from the Babylonian captivity.
- An ancestor of the prophet Zephaniah.

=== Hezir ===
Hezir (חֵזִיר) is the name of 2 biblical individuals in the Hebrew Bible.

- A priest in the head of the seventeenth lot of the twenty-four lots ordained by David. (1 Chronicles 24:15)
- An individual who signed the covenant with Nehemiah. (Nehemiah 10:20)

=== Hezron ===
Hezron or Hetzron (Hebrew: חֶצְרוֹן, Modern: Ḥetsron, Tiberian: Ḥeṣrôn, "Enclosed") is the name of two men in Genesis.

- In Genesis 46:9, Hezron is a son of Reuben and the founder of the Hezronites.
- In Genesis 46:12, Hezron is grandson of Judah and the son of Pharez.

=== Hiel ===
Hiel the Bethelite (Heb. אֲחִיאֵל, חִיאֵל; "the [divine] brother, or kinsman, is God")) rebuilt Jericho during the reign of King Ahab. (1 Kings 16:34)

=== Hillel of Pirathon ===
- The father of Abdon, in the Book of Judges (Judges 12:13–15).

=== Hirah ===
- Hirah was an Adullamite who Judah met with and befriended in Genesis 38:1, 12.

=== Hiram ===
Hiram (Hebrew: חירם Ḥiram) of Tyre, son of a widow of the tribe of Naphtali whose father was a craftsman in bronze, was given the metal work of King Soloman's temple. 1 Kings 7:13–14. According to The Interpreter's Bible, Hiram is a shortened form of אחירם (aḥîrām, "brother of Ram [the lofty one].")

=== Hobab ===
Hobab (חֹבָב "cherished") was Moses's father-in-law (according to Numbers 10:29) or brother-in-law (according to most English translations of Judges 4:11). The relevant part of Numbers 10:29 reads: "And Moses said unto Hobab, the son of Reuel the Midianite, Moses' father-in-law". Reuel (or Raguel) and Jethro may have been different persons from different narratives. That of Judges 4:11 reads: "Now Heber the Kenite had severed himself from the Kenites, even from the children of Hobab the father-in-law of Moses" (some versions say, "brother-in-law"). Moses invited Hobab to take part in the Exodus journey into the Promised Land, wanting to make use of his local knowledge, but Hobab preferred to return home to Midian (Numbers 10:29–31). Briefly, Hobab, Reuel/Raguel, and Jethro were all Moses' father-in-law, due to different traditions (and possibly corruptions of the text) which were syncretized in the interpretations of later commentators.

=== Hod ===
Hod (הוֹד "splendor") is a biblical name which appears only in 1 Chronicles 7:37. He appears as one character, a son of Zophah in a genealogy of the Tribe of Asher.

=== Hodaviah ===
Hodaviah (הוֹדַוְיָה) is the name of three individuals in the Bible. The Revised Version and King James Version of the Bible sometimes spell it as Hodaiah, Hodevah, or Hodeiah.

- Hodaviah, a clan leader in the Tribe of Manasseh, according to 1 Chronicles 5:24.
- Hodaviah son of Hassenuah appears as the ancestor of a Benjamite man living in Jerusalem after the Babylonian captivity. This Hodaviah is called "Judah son of Hassenuah" in Nehemian 11:9.
- Hodaviah son of Elioenai is described as a descendant of Zerubbabel in 1 Chronicles 3:24

=== Hodesh ===
Hodesh is a figure who appears in a genealogy of the Tribe of Benjamin in Chronicles. The name might mean "born at the feast of the new moon," or else it may be a misspelling of Ahishahar.

=== Hoham ===
Hoham (הוֹהָם), according to the Book of Joshua, was the king of Hebron, defeated in Joshua's conquest.

=== Homam ===
See Hemam.

=== Hon ===
See On (biblical figure)

=== Hori ===
Hori (חֹרִי "cave dweller") is the personal name of two biblical individuals, as well as being the Hebrew term for a Horite.

- Hori of the house of Simeon was the father of Shaphat, a scout sent to Canaan prior to the crossing of the Jordan River according to Numbers 13:5.
- Hori is recorded as the son of Lotan, the son of Seir the Horite, according to Genesis 36:22.

=== Hoshama ===
Hoshama (הוֹשָׁמָע "whom YHWH hears") is the name of one of the seven sons of Jeconiah, according to 1 Chronicles 3:18, the only place in the Bible that refers to him. It is a shortened version of the name "Jehoshama."

=== Hotham ===
Hotham is the name for two individuals found in the BIble. A Hotham appears in a genealogy of the Tribe of Asher in 1 Chronicles 7:32, but this individual is referred to as "Helem" in verse 35. Another Hotham, though the KJV calls him Hothan, can be found in 1 Chronicles 11:44, where his sons Shama and Jeiel are listed among David's Mighty Warriors. This second Hotham is called an Aroerite.

=== Hothir ===
Hothir (הוֹתִיר "abundance") is listed as a son of David's "seer" Heman and a Kohathite Levite in 1 Chronicles 25:4 and 28.

=== Hubbah ===
See Jehubbah.

=== Huppah ===
Huppah (חֻפָּה "canopy") was a priest who was in charge of the 13th lot out of the twenty-four lots ordained by David. (1 Chronicles 24:13)

=== Huppim ===
Huppim (חופים) or Hupham (חופם) was the ninth son of Benjamin in Genesis 46:21 and Numbers 26:39.

=== Hushim ===
Hushim, according to Genesis 46:23, was the name of the sons of Dan, listed among the 70 souls to migrate to Egypt with Jacob. Numbers 26:42 calls Dan's son Shuham, and his descendants the Shuhamites. The Talmud names him as the murderer of Esau.

=== Huzzab ===
Huzzab is either a name or a word which appears in Nahum 2:7 (verse 8 in some Bibles). In a passage in which Nahum is predicting the fall of Nineveh, the prophet says, "Huzzab shall be led away captive" in the King James Version. However, a number of more contemporary versions since the late nineteenth century have interpreted the word as a verb, meaning "and it has been decreed."

== I ==
=== Ibhar ===
Ibhar was one of the sons of David, born in Jerusalem. The name Ibhar means "Chosen".

=== Ibneiah ===
Ibneiah (Hebrew: יִבְנְיָה) is the name given in Chronicles to a leader of a clan in the Tribe of Benjamin which returned to Yehud Medinata after the Babylonian captivity. The same character is referred to as "Gabbai" in the parallel passage in Nehemiah.

=== Ibnijah ===
Ibnijah (Hebrew: יִבְנִיָּה "whom YHWH will build up") is a figure who is mentioned indirectly in 1 Chronicles 9:8, by way of his descendant "Meshullam, son of Shephatiah, son of Reuel, son of Ibnijah." He was a Benjamite.

=== Ibsam ===
According to Chronicles, Ibsam (Hebrew: יִבְשָׂם "pleasant")was the son of Tola, who in turn was the son of Issachar. He is called Jibsam in the King James Version.

=== Idbash ===
Idbash (Hebrew:יִדְבָּשׁ "stout"), according to 1 Chronicles 4:3, was one of the 3 sons of Etam, a figure who appears in the Chronicler's genealogy of the Tribe of Judah.

=== Igal ===
Igal (יגאל) is the name of three biblical figures.

- Igal son of Joseph of Issachar, a scout sent to Canaan prior to the crossing of the Jordan River according to Numbers 13:7.
- Igal son of Nathan of Zobah is mentioned only in 2 Samuel 23:36 in a list of David's Mighty Warriors.
- Igal son of Shemaiah is listed as a descendant of Zerubbabel in 1 Chronicles 3:22. This last figure is called Igeal in the King James Version, although his name in Hebrew is the same as the other two Igals.

=== Igdaliah ===
Igdaliah (Hebrew yigdalyahu) is mentioned in passing as a prophet or holy man and the father of a man named Hanan in Jeremiah 35:4. According to the Book of Jeremiah, in the time of Josiah, the sons or descendants of Hanan son of Igdaliah had their own chamber in the temple at Jerusalem, which was the site of the famous object-lesson concerning Jeremiah and the Rechabites. The Encyclopaedia Biblica claimed that the name Igdaliah was most likely a mistaken form of the name Gedaliah.

=== Ikkesh ===
Ikkesh (Hebrew: עִקֵּשׁ "twisted") the Tekoite was the father of Ira, one of King David's Warriors (2 Samuel 23:26, 1 Chronicles 11:28).

=== Ilai ===
See Zalmon (biblical figure).

=== Imla ===
Imla (Hebrew – ימלא, "whom God will fill up"), the father of Micaiah, which latter was the prophet who foretold the defeat of the allied kings of Judah and Israel against Ramoth-gilead (2 Chron 18:7–8). In the parallel passage (1 Kings 22:8–9) his name is written Imlah.

=== Immer ===
Immer (Hebrew: אִמֵּר) was a member of the priestly family whose sons, Hanani and Zebadiah, had both taken pagan wives but repented during the communal confession instigated by the biblical priest Ezra.

=== Imna ===
Imna (Hebrew: יִמְנָע "He will restrain") is a biblical name which appears only in 1 Chronicles 7:35, as the son of Helem in a genealogy of the Tribe of Asher.

=== Imnah ===
Imnah (Hebrew: יִמְנָה) was a Levite, the father of Kore, who was responsible for distributing the freewill offerings of the Temple in the time of King Hezekiah (2 Chronicles 31:14).

=== Imrah ===
Imrah (Hebrew: יִמְרָה "bitterness") is a biblical name which appears only in 1 Chronicles 7:36, in a genealogy of the Tribe of Asher.

=== Imri ===
Imri (Hebrew: אִמְרִי "eloquent") is the name of two individuals mentioned in the Hebrew Bible.

- An Imri is mentioned in passing in the ancestry of a man named Uthai, who according to 1 Chronicles 9:4 lived in Jerusalem after the return from the Babylonian captivity.
- A man named "Zakkur son of Imri" is recorded as taking responsibility for a section of the wall in the project of rebuilding the wall of Jerusalem, according to Nehemiah 3:2.

=== Iphdeiah ===
Iphdeiah (KJV Iphediah Hebrew: יִפְדְּיָה "YHWH will redeem") is a name which appears very briefly as that of "Iphdeiah son of Shashak," mentioned only in a genealogy of the Tribe of Benjamin according to Chronicles.

=== Ir ===
See Iri (biblical figure).

=== Ira the Jairite ===
Ira the Jairite was David's chief minister or priest after Sheba's rebellion. While described as David's priest by the English Standard Version and New International Version, other translations describe Ira as David's chief ruler (King James Version) or his chief minister (New King James Version). The Hebrew word "כֹּהֵן" literally means "one officiating".

=== Irad ===
In Genesis 4:18, Irad (Hebrew: עִירָד – 'Īrāḏ), is the son of Enoch, the grandson of Cain and the father of Mehujael.

According to the Book of Moses (an LDS text), Irad discovers and publicises his great-grandson Lamech's (descendant of Cain) covenant with the Devil. As a result, Lamech kills Irad and subsequently suffers ostracization.

=== Iram ===
Iram (Hebrew: עִירָם) is a name which appears in Genesis 36:43. In the Masoretic Text as it now stands, Iram is identified as a "tribal leader" (Hebrew alluph) of Edom. However, Thomas Kelly suggests that originally the text may have identified Iram and the other "tribal leaders" as the names not of individuals, but of clans, using the Hebrew word eleph to mean "clan."

=== Iri ===
Iri, according to 1 Chronicles 7:7, was one of the sons of Bela, who was the son of Benjamin, eponymous founder of the Tribe of Benjamin. In verse 12, he is referred to simply as Ir.

=== Irijah ===
Irijah (Hebrew יראייה yiriyyah) is an official who arrests Jeremiah on suspicion of desertion.

=== Iru ===
Iru (Hebrew: עִירוּ "watch") is a name mentioned only once in the Hebrew Bible. In 1 Chronicles 4:15, Iru is listed as one of the sons of Caleb. The other two were Elah and Naam.

=== Iscah ===
Iscah or Jesca (Jessica) was a daughter of Haran, sister of Lot and Milcah according to Genesis 11:29.

=== Ishbah ===
For the "Ishbah, father of Eshtemoa" mentioned in 1 Chronicles, see List of minor biblical tribes § Ishbah.

=== Ishbi-benob ===
Ishbi-benob a giant whose name appears in the Qere of the Masoretic Text at 2 Samuel 21:16. Qere is the term for the version of the text traditionally read aloud in synagogues. The Ketiv, the version written but not read aloud, reads somewhat differently, in a manner that suggested to Thomas Kelly Cheyne that the opening words of the verse were not the name of the giant, but words that indicated that David and his soldiers stayed in (the city of) Nob. Whatever the case with the Ketiv, the Qere as it now stands asserts that Ishbi-benob was the name of a Philistine giant, who was killed by Abishai son of Zeruiah. Gesenius interprets his name as meaning "dweller upon the height". In Brenton's Septuagint Translation, his name is given as Jesbi, the progeny of Rapha.

=== Ishhod ===
Ishhod (King James Version Ishod Hebrew: אִישְׁהוֹד "man of majesty") is a figure mentioned only once in the Hebrew Bible. 1 Chronicles 7:18 lists Ishod as a son of Hammoleketh in a genealogy of the Tribe of Manasseh.

=== Ishi ===
Ishi (Hebrew: יִשְׁעִי "He saves me") is mentioned in Chronicles several times.

- Son of Appaim, one of the line of Jerahmeel of the house of Hezron
- A chief of Judah, father of Zoheth and Ben-zoheth
- A chief of Simeon and head of a family
- A chief of Manasseh and head of a clan on the east of Jordan

=== Ishmael ===
Ishmael was the name of 6 biblical individuals in the Hebrew Bible:

- Ishmael the firstborn of Abraham through Hagar and mentioned many times in the Hebrew Bible.
- Ishmael the son of Nethaniah who assassinated Gedaliah at the time of Nebuchadnezzar II.
- One of the 6 sons of Azel mentioned in 1 Chronicles 8:38.
- A son of Jehohanan mentioned in 2 Chronicles 23:1 as one of the captains who aided Jehoiada in restoring Joash to the throne.
- The father of Zebadiah mentioned in 2 Chronicles 19:11.
- One of the sons of Pashur which was Elioenai, Maaseiah, Ishmael, Nethaneel, Jozabad and Eleasah. (Ezra 10:22)

=== Ishmaiah ===
Ishmaiah (KJV Ismaiah Hebrew: יִשְׁמַעְיָה "YHWH will hear") is the name of two biblical figures.

- Ishmaiah son of Obadiah was the leader of the Tribe of Zebulun in the time of David, according to 1 Chronicles 27:19. He is called Samaias in the Septuagint.
- Ishmaiah the Gibeonite, according to 1 Chronicles 12:4, was one of David's Mighty Warriors.

=== Ishmerai ===
Ishmerai (Hebrew: יִשְׁמְרַי) is a biblical figure mentioned only in 1 Chronicles 8:18, where he is called "the son of Elpaal" in a genealogy of the Tribe of Benjamin. He may be the same character as the "Shemer" or "Shemed" mentioned in 1 Chronicles 8:12.

=== Ishod ===
See Ishhod.

=== Ishpah ===
Ishpah (KJV Ispah Hebrew: יִשְׁפָּה "He is bare") is a name which appears in a genealogy of the Tribe of Benjamin. According to 1 Chronicles 8, Ishpah was the son of Beriah, the son of Elpaal, the son of Shaharaim.

=== Ishpan ===
Ishpan (Hebrew: יִשְׁפָּן "he hides") is a figure who appears only once in the Hebrew Bible, in a genealogical passage describing the people of the Tribe of Benjamin. 1 Chronicles 8 calls him the son of Shashak, the son of Elpaal, the son of Shaharaim.

=== Ishuah ===
See Ishvah.

=== Ishuai ===
See Ishvah.

=== Ishui ===
See Ishvi.

=== Ishvah ===
Ishvah (KJV Ishuah and Isuah Hebrew: יִשְׁוָה "he will resemble") was one of the sons of Asher according to Genesis 46:17 and 1 Chronicles 7:30, although he is missing from the list of the sons of Asher found in Numbers 26:44.

=== Ishvi ===
Ishvi (KJV Ishui, Isui, Jesui, and Ishuai Hebrew: יִשְׁוִי "he resembles me") is the name of two figures in the Hebrew Bible.

- Ishvi is the name given to a son of Asher, eponymous founder of the Tribe of Asher, in Genesis 46:17, Numbers 26:44, and 1 Chronicles 7:30. His descendants are called Ishvites in Numbers 24:44. Genesis 46 places him in the list of 70 persons who went down into Egypt with Jacob, the father of Asher and the other eleven Tribes of Israel.
- Ishvi is the name of a son of Saul in 1 Samuel 14:49.

=== Ismaiah ===
See Ishmaiah.

=== Ispah ===
See Ishpah.

=== Isui ===
See Ishvi.

=== Ithai ===
See Ittai.

=== Ithmah ===
Ithmah (Hebrew: יִתְמָה "orphan") is a name which appears only once in the Hebrew Bible, in 1 Chronicles 11:46, where "Ithmah the Moabite" is listed as one of David's Mighty Warriors.

=== Ithran ===
Ithran (Hebrew: יִתְרָן "advantage") is the name given for two figures in the Hebrew Bible.

- Ithran, son of Dishon, son of Anah, son of Zibeon, son of Seir the Horite. This Ithran represents the name of a Horite clan.
- Ithran, son of Zophah, son of Helem appears in a genealogy of the Tribe of Asher. The Encyclopaedia Biblica identifies the "Jether" of 1 Chronicles 7:38 as probably being identical to this Ithran.

=== Ithream ===
Ithream (יתרעם, "abundant people") was the son of David and Eglah, David's sixth son, according to 2 Samuel 3:5.

=== Ittai ===
Ittai (and once in Chronicles, Ithai) is the name given one or two biblical figures:

- Ittai the Gittite appears alongside 600 soldiers as a Philistine ally of David in the time leading up to Absalom's rebellion. Having only recently arrived in Jerusalem, David gives him an option to return home to Gath, but Ittai confirms his loyalty to David and helps him evacuate the city. During the rebellion itself, he serves as commander of a third of David's army.
- Ittai "son of Ribai, from Gibeah, of the children of Benjamin" is listed as one of David's Mighty Warriors. His association with Gibeah and the Tribe of Benjamin "probably" distinguish him from the Gittite Ittai, according to Stanley Arthur Cook. This Benjamite Ittai is once called Ithai in 1 Chronicles 11:31.

=== Izhar ===
For the Levitical clan, see Izhar.

Izhar son of Hela is a figure who appears in a genealogy of the Tribe of Judah, in 1 Chronicles 4:7. He is called Izhar according to the variant reading known as Qere. According to the Ketiv his name is Zohar. The King James Version calls him Jezoar.

=== Izrahiah ===
Izrahiah (Jezrahiah) (יִזְרַחְיָה "YHWH will shine") is the name of two biblical figures.

- Izrahiah son of Uzzi, son of Tola, son of Issachar appears in a genealogy of the Tribe of Issachar.
- Izrahiah (KJV Jezrahiah) is, according to Nehemiah 12:42, a leader of singers in a procession headed by Nehemiah.

=== Izri ===
Izri (Zeri) appears in a list of persons responsible for liturgical music in the time of David, according to 1 Chronicles 25:11. In 1 Chronicles 25:3, he is called Zeri.

=== Izziah ===
Izziah (KJV Jeziah Hebrew: יִזִּיָּה "YHWH sprinkles"), a descendant of Parosh, is listed as one of the men who married foreign wives in the time of Nehemiah.

== J ==
=== Jaanai ===
See Janai (biblical figure). See Djenne'.

=== Jaareshiah ===
Jaareshiah (KJV Jaresiah Hebrew:יַעֲרֶשְׁיָה "whom YHWH nourishes") is a name which appears only 1 Chronicles 8:27, where Jaaresiah is identified as one of the sons of Jeroham. The text does not identify any information about Jeroham's parentage, but the passage is part of a genealogy of the Tribe of Benjamin.

=== Jaasai ===
See Jaasu.

=== Jaasau ===
See Jaasu.

=== Jaasiel ===
Jaasiel (Jasiel) (יַעֲשִׂיאֵל "God is maker") is the name of one of David's Mighty Warriors. He is referred to in Hebrew as hammitsovayah, which has been variously translated as "the Mezobaite," "the Mesobaite," or "from Zobah." A "Jaasiel son of Abner" is listed as a Benjamite leader in 1 Chronicles 27:21, who may be the same person.

=== Jaasu ===
Jaasu (also called Jaasau, Jaasai) (יַעֲשׂוּ "they will do") was one of the descendants of Bani alleged to have married foreign women in the time of Ezra and Nehemiah.

=== Jaaziah ===
Jaaziah (יַעֲזִיָּהוּ "made bold by YHWH") is listed as one of the sons of Merari in a passage discussing the various divisions of Levites.

=== Jaaziel ===
Jaaziel is the name of a Levite musician who appears in 1 Chronicles 15:18. He reappears as "Aziel" in 15:20.

=== Jacan ===
Jacan (or Jachan) (יַעְכָּן) is a name which appears once in the Hebrew Bible, in a list of Gadites in Chronicles.

=== Jachin ===
Jachin (יָכִין) was the fourth son of Simeon according to Genesis 46:10, Exodus 6:15, and Numbers 26:12, one of the 70 souls to migrate to Egypt with Jacob.

=== Jada ===
Jada (יָדָע "He knows"), a Judahite, was one of the sons of Onam mentioned in 1 Chronicles 2:28 in the genealogy of the sons of Jerahmeel and his wife Atarah; he had two sons Jonathan and Jether, and his brother was named Shammai. He was a descendant of Hezron.

=== Jahath ===
Jahath (יַחַת "He will snatch up") is the name of several individuals in the Hebrew Bible.

- Jahath son of Reaiah, son of Shobal, descendant of Judah is mentioned in 1 Chronicles 4:2, in a genealogical passage describing the Tribe of Judah.

Jahath is a name applied to various Levites:

- A son of Libni and grandson of Gershom and great grandson of Levi in 1 Chronicles 6:20 (verse 5 in some Bibles) and 6:43 (verse 28 in some Bibles)
- A Gershonite Levite; the eldest son of Shimei and the grandson of Ladan; founder of the house of Jahath (1 Chronicles 23:10)
- A Levite and son of Shelomoth (1 Chronicles 24:22)
- A Merarite Levite in the reign of Josiah (2 Chronicles 34:12)

=== Jahaziah ===
See Jahzeiah.

=== Jahleel ===
Jahleel (יַחְלְאֵל "God waits") was a son of Zebulun and founder of the family of the Jahleelites according to Genesis 46:14 and Numbers 26:26. He was one of the 70 persons to migrate to Egypt with Jacob.

=== Jahmai ===
For the Jahmai of 1 Chronicles 7:2, see List of minor biblical tribes § Jahmai.

=== Jahzeel ===
Jahzeel (יַחְצְאֵל "God divides") was a son of Naphtali and founder of the family of Jahzeelites according to Genesis 46:24 and Numbers 26:48. He was one of the 70 persons to migrate to Egypt with Jacob.

=== Jahzeiah ===
Jahzeiah (KJV Jahaziah Hebrew: יַחְזְיָה "YHWH views") son of Tikvah is one of the figures listed in the Book of Ezra as opposing Ezra's prohibition on marriages with foreign women.

=== Jahzerah ===
Jahzerah is a name which appears only in 1 Chronicles 9:12. See Ahzai.

=== Jair ===
Jair, see Yair.

=== Jakeh ===
Jakeh is a name that appears only in Proverbs 30:1, where part of the Book of Proverbs is ascribed to a man called "Agur son of Jakeh". Franz Delitzsch proposed that the name "Jakeh" means "scrupulously pious".

=== Janai ===
Janai (Jaanai) (יַעֲנַי "whom YHWH answers") is a name that appears only 1 Chronicles 5:12, where Janai is listed as a descendant of Gad. According to the Encyclopaedia Biblica, the name represents the name of a clan within the Tribe of Gad.

=== Jakim ===
Jakim (יָקִים) is the name of one individual mentioned in the Hebrew Bible, as well as one individual mentioned in some manuscripts of the New Testament's Gospel of Matthew. In a genealogy of the Tribe of Benjamin, in 1 Chronicles 24:12, a Jakim appears, as the son of Shimei (who is referred to as Shema in verse 13). In some Greek manuscripts of Matthew, a Jakim appears between Josiah and Jechoniah in a genealogy of Jesus.

=== Jalon ===
Jalon (יָלוֹן "YHWH lodges") was one of four sons of Ezrah, and the uncle of Miriam, Shammai and Ishbah (father of Eshtemoa). (1 Chr. 4:17)

=== Jamin ===
The name Jamin means right hand. There are four different Jamins in the Bible:

1. The second son of Simeon according to Genesis 46:10, Exodus 6:15, and Numbers 26:12. He was one of the 70 souls to migrate to Egypt with Jacob.
2. Man of Judah, see 1 Chronicles 2:27
3. Post exile Levite who interpreted the law, see Nehemiah 8:7,8
4. The son of Ram the firstborn of Jerahmeel according to the book of 1 Chronicles.

=== Jamlech ===
Jamlech (יַמְלֵךְ "He will reign") is a figure who appears once in the Hebrew Bible, in list of kin group leaders in the Tribe of Simeon, who according to the Bible lived in the time of Hezekiah and exterminated the Meunim.

=== Japhia ===
Japhia (יָפִיעַ "shining") is the name of two individuals in the Hebrew Bible. Not to be confused with the ancient Jewish town of Japhia/Japha.

- The king of Lachish, one of the five kings of the Amorites whose battle against the settling Israelites led by Joshua is reported in Joshua 10:1–15. Along with the other four kings, he was subsequently found in a cave at Makkedah, where he was killed and buried by Joshua and his forces (Joshua 10:26–27).
- A son of David by a concubine (2 Samuel 5:15)

=== Jarah ===
See Jehoaddah. meaning: honey, god gives honey, honeycomb, honeysuckle

=== Jareb ===
Jareb is a name which appears in Hosea 5:13 and 10:6 in some translations of the Bible. In both passages, the Hebrew text refers to a mlk yrb (KJV "King Jareb") in a way that implies that mlk yrb is the king of Assyria. However, no Assyrian king by the name of "Jareb" is known to history, which has led to a variety of conjectures about what the phrase refers to. According to W. F. Albright, the "definitive solution" to the problem is that the text should read mlk rb or mlky rb, meaning "the great king", a Hebrew translation of the common Assyrian royal title sharru rabu. The proposed emendation to "great king" has been accepted in a number of biblical translations.

=== Jarib ===
Jarib (יָרִיב "he contends") is the name of three individuals in the Hebrew Bible, and a priest whose descendants are named in the First Book of Maccabees.

- In 1 Chronicles 4:24, one of the sons of Simeon (son of Jacob) is called Jarib. In other passages, he is called Jachin.
- A Jarib appears in a list of leaders recruited by Ezra to find Levites for the resettlement of Jerusalem.
- A priest by the name of Jarib is mentioned in a list of men who married foreign women in Ezra 10:18.
- In 1 Maccabees 2:1 and 14:29, Mattathias and his son Simon are described as being "of the posterity of Jarib". The New English Translation of the Septuagint transliterates the name as Ioarib, while the New American Bible reads Joarib and the Good News Translation reads Jehoiarib.

=== Jaresiah ===
See Jaareshiah.

=== Jarha ===
Jarha was an Egyptian slave of Sheshan, about the time of Eli, who was married to Sheshan's daughter according to 1 Chronicles 2:34–35.

=== Jasiel ===
See Jaasiel.

=== Jasub/Jashub ===
1. See Job, son of Issachar

2. See Shearjashub

3. A son of Bani who had to put away a foreign wife in Ezra 10:29.

=== Jathniel ===
Jathniel (יַתְנִיאֵל "God hires me"), a Korahite Levite and the 4th of the family of Meshelemiah, is a minor biblical figure who appears only in 1 Chronicles 26:2, in a list of Korahite porters.

=== Jaziz ===
Jaziz (יָזִיז "He makes prominent") the Hagrite, according to 1 Chronicles 27:31, was in charge of king David's flocks of sheep and goats.

=== Jeatherai ===
See Ethni.

=== Jecamiah ===
See Jekamiah.

=== Jecholiah ===
Jecholiah (Hebrew: יכליהו, yekhalyahu) of Jerusalem was the wife of the King of Judah, Amaziah, and the mother of King Azariah. Depending on translation used, her name may also be spelled Jechiliah, Jecoliah, or Jekoliah. Also 2 Chronicles 26:3

=== Jediael ===
There are three individuals in the Hebrew Bible named Jediael (יְדִיעֲאֵל).

- Jediael son of Shimri is listed as one of David's warriors in 1 Chronicles 11:45.
- Jediael, a man from the Tribe of Manasseh, appears in a list of warriors said to have deserted David when he went to Ziklag.
- Jediael son of Meshelemiah appears in a list of Korahite porters in the time of David.

=== Jeezer ===
Jeezer (Iezer) (Hebrew:אִיעֶזֵר "no help") was a son of Gilead of the Tribe of Manasseh according to Numbers 26:30.

=== Jehallelel ===
Jehallelel (KJV Jehaleleel or Jehalelel Hebrew:יְהַלֶּלְאֵל "God is praised") is the name of two individuals in the Hebrew Bible.

- A Jehallelel appears in 1 Chronicles 4:16, in a genealogy of the Tribe of Judah.
- Another Jehallelel, father of Azariah, appears in a list of Levites in the time of Hezekiah in 2 Chronicles 29:12.

=== Jehdeiah ===
Jehdeiah (יֶחְדִּיָּהוּ "YHWH is unity") is the name of two individuals in the Hebrew Bible.

- A Levite in the time of David mentioned in 1 Chronicles 24:20.
- Jehdeiah the Meronothite, who according to 1 Chronicles 27:30 was in charge of king David's she-donkeys.

=== Jehezkel ===
Jehezkel (יְחֶזְקֵאל "God strengthens") was the head of the twentieth lot out of the twenty-four lots ordained by David for the temple service in 1 Chronicles 24:16.

=== Jehiah ===
Jehiah (יְחִיָּה "YHWH lives") is a figure who is only mentioned once in the Bible, in 1 Chronicles 15:24, which describes him as a gatekeeper for the Ark of the Covenant during its establishment in Jerusalem in the time of David.

=== Jehiel ===
This entry contains close paraphrases and borrowing of wording found in entries entitled "Jehiel" in the Encyclopaedia Biblica, a work which is now in the public domain.

Jehiel is the name of fourteen figures in the Hebrew Bible.

For eleven of these the English spelling "Jehiel" reflects the Hebrew name יחיאל:

- A Levite musician in the time of David (1 Chronicles 15:18, 20; 16:5).
- The leader of a family of Gershonite Levites in the time of David, custodian of "the treasury of the house of the Lord" (1 Chronicles 23:8; 29:8).
- Jehiel the son of Hachmoni, who was with David's sons (1 Chronicles 27:32).
- Jehiel the son of king Jehoshaphat (2 Chronicles 21:2).
- A Hemanite Levite in the time of Hezekiah, called Jehuel in the Revised Version (2 Chronicles 29:14).
- A Levitical or priestly overseer of the temple in the time of Hezekiah (2 Chronicles 31:13).
- A person referred to as "ruler of the house of God" in the time of Josiah (2 Chronicles 35:8). In the Septuagint text 1 Esdras, this person is referred to as "Syelus".
- The father of Obadiah in a post-exilic list of kin groups (Ezra 8:9).
- The father of Shechaniah (Ezra 10:2).
- Jehiel the son of Harim, a priest (Ezra 10:21).
- Jehiel the son of Elam, a layman (Ezra 10:26).

For the other three, the name Jehiel (or Jeiel) reflects the Hebrew spelling יעיאל:

- One of the sons of Elam (Ezra 10:2).
- A Gibeonite described as the "father of Gibeon" in 1 Chronicles 9:35.
- A son of Hothan the Aroerite, who along with his brother Shama was listed as one of David's Mighty Warriors in 1 Chronicles 11:44.

=== Jehizkiah ===
Jehizkiah (יְחִזְקִיָּה) son of Shallum is mentioned in a list of Ephraimite leaders who, according to 2 Chronicles 28, intervened along with the prophet Oded to prevent the enslavement of 200,000 people from the Kingdom of Judah during the time of the king Ahaz.

=== Jehoaddah ===
Joehoaddah (or Jehoadah, Jarah) was one of the descendants of King Saul, according to 1 Chronicles 8:33–36. In 1 Chronicles 9:42, which contains a copy of the same genealogy of Saul, his name is given as "Jarah."

=== Jehoaddan ===
Jehoaddan (Hebrew: יהועדן, Yehōaddān; "YHWH delights") was a native of Jerusalem, the wife of King Joash of Judah, and mother of his successor, King Amaziah. 2 Kings 14:2

=== Jehoiada ===
Jehoiada (Hebrew: יהוידע,Yehoyada "The LORD Knows") was the name of at least three people in the Hebrew Bible:

- Jehoiada, a priest during the reigns of Ahaziah, Athaliah, and Joash (q.v.)
- Jehoiada, father of Benaiah (cf. Benaiah)
- Jehoiada, a priest in the time of Jeremiah (Jeremiah 29:26)

=== Jehoshaphat ===
Jehoshaphat (Hebrew: יהושפט, yehoshaphat, God Judges), son of Paruah, was one of King Solomon's twelve regional administrators: his jurisdiction was Issachar (1 Kings 4:17).

Jehosphaphat, son of Ahilud, was King Solomon's recorder (1 Kings 4:3).

=== Jehozabad ===
Jehozabad (Hebrew: יהוזבד, yehozabad) is the name of three figures in the Hebrew Bible.

- Jehozabad son of Shomer was one of the assassinators of King Joash of Judah. 2 Kings 12:21. "This person is called Zabad, in 2 Chron. xxiv.26..."
- Jehozabad, according 2 Chronicles 17:18, was a leader of 180,000 Benjamite warriors in the time of king Jehoshaphat.
- Jehozabad is listed as one of the sons of Obed-edom according to 1 Chronicles 26:4.

=== Jehubbah ===
Jehubbah (or Hubbah) is the name of an individual who appears in a genealogy of the Tribe of Asher. His name depends on which variant reading (see Qere and Ketiv) of the Masoretic Text one follows: the Ketiv reads yhbh ("Jehubbah") the Qere reads whbh ("and Hubbah").

=== Jehudi ===
Jehudi (Hebrew יהודי "Judahite") "the son of Nethaniah, the son of Shelemiah, the son of Cushi" (Jeremiah 36:14) was one of the delegates the princes sent to fetch Baruch, Jeremiah's scribe, to read his scroll.

=== Jehudijah ===
Jehudijah (Hebrew: הַיְהֻדִיָּ֗ה), mentioned in 1 Chronicles 4:18, is the name given to the wife of Mered, and is listed as the mother of his children. Some Rabbinic sources claim that Jehudijah, a feminine form of the Hebrew yehudi (Hebrew: יְהוּדִי), meaning "Jew," is to be used as a noun rather than a given name, interpreting the passage as "his wife, the Jewess" rather than "his wife, Jehudijah," and that it is referring to Pharaoh's daughter, Bithiah, who is mentioned in the same passage and is said to have converted to Judaism. As Bithiah was an Egyptian, it would have been worth noting that she was a Jewess, especially given the importance of matrilineality in Judaism, though this was not the case in the Biblical era.

=== Jehush ===
See Jeush.

=== Jeiel ===
Jeiel (יְעִיאֵל "God sweeps away") is the name of ten individuals in the Hebrew Bible.

- Jeiel, according to 1 Chronicles 5:7, was a leader in the Tribe of Reuben of the house of Joel.
- Jeiel, referred to as the "father of Gibeon", was an ancestor of King Saul. The King James Version calls him "Jehiel." This figure's name is affected by variant readings preserved through the Qere and Ketiv system in the Masoretic Text: the Ketiv calls him "Jeuel," while the Qere calls him "Jeiel."
- Jeiel son of Hotham the Aroerite is listed as one of David's warriors in 1 Chronicles 11:44. The King James Version calls him "Jehiel." This figure's name is affected by variant readings preserved through the Qere and Ketiv system in the Masoretic Text: the Ketiv calls him "Jeuel," while the Qere calls him "Jeiel."
- A Jeiel is mentioned in passing in a list of gatekeepers for the Ark of the Covenant in 1 Chronicles 15:18.
- A Jeiel is listed as one of the ancestors of a Levite named Jahaziel in the time of king Jehoshaphat in 2 Chronicles 20:14.
- A Jeiel was one of the scribes of Uzziah who kept the account of the king's irregular predatory warriors according to 2 Chronicles 26:11. This figure's name is affected by variant readings preserved through the Qere and Ketiv system in the Masoretic Text: the Ketiv calls him "Jeuel," while the Qere calls him "Jeiel."
- A Jeiel is recorded as a Gershonite Levite of the sons of Elizaphan in the time of Hezekiah. This figure's name is affected by variant readings preserved through the Qere and Ketiv system in the Masoretic Text: the Ketiv calls him "Jeuel," while the Qere calls him "Jeiel." The Revised Version calls him Jeuel, following the Ketiv.
- A Jeiel is recorded as a leader in the Tribe of Levi in time of Josiah according to 2 Chronicles 35:9.
- In a list of returnees to Yehud Medinata after the end of the Babylonian captivity, a Jeiel is recorded as being the head of a group of relatives according to Ezra 8:13. The Revised Version calls him Jeuel.
- A Jeiel, of the "descendants of Nebo," is listed as one of the people opposing marriage to foreign women in the time of Nehemiah.

=== Jekameam ===
Jekameam (יְקַמְעָם "let the people rise"), a Levite, the 4th son of Hebron is mentioned in passing in two genealogical passages.

=== Jekamiah ===
Jekamiah (KJV spelling Jecamiah Hebrew: יְקַמְיָה "YHWH raises") is the name of two individuals in the Hebrew Bible.

- Jekamiah son of Shallum, son of Sismai, son of Eleasah, son of Helez, son of Azariah, son of Jehu, son of Obed, son of Ephlal, son of Zabad, son of Nathan, son of Attai, son of Jarha, the son-in-law and slave of Sheshan, son of Ishi, son of Appaim, son of Nadab, son of Shammai, son of Onam, son of Jerahmeel, the alleged ancestor of the Jerahmeelites.
- Jekamiah, a son of Jeconiah, the last king of Judah, who was taken captive by the Babylonians.

=== Jekoliah ===
See Jecholiah.

=== Jekuthiel ===
Jekuthiel (יְקוּתִיאֵל "cleansing of God"), father of Zanoah, appears in 1 Chronicles 4:18, in a genealogical passage concerning the Tribe of Judah.

=== Jemima ===
Jemimah, meaning "Dove" was a daughter of Job according to Job 42:14.

=== Jemuel ===
Jemuel was the first son of Simeon according to Genesis 46:10, Exodus 6:15, and Numbers 26:12. He was one of the 70 souls to migrate to Egypt with Jacob.

=== Jephunneh ===
Jephunneh (יְפֻנֶּה) is a biblical name which means "for whom a way is prepared", and was the name of two biblical figures:

- A descendant of Judah, and father of Kenaz and Caleb the spy, who is also called a Kenezite. See (Numbers 13:6 etc.; Numbers 32:12 etc.; Joshua 14:14 etc.; 1 Chronicles 4:15).
- A descendant of Asher, eldest of the three sons of Jether (1 Chronicles 7:38).

=== Jerah ===
Jerah (יֶרַח "new moon") was a son of Joktan according to Genesis 10:26, 1 Chronicles 1:20.

=== Jeremai ===
Jeremai (יְרֵמַי "my exaltations"), one of the "descendants of Hashum," is a figure who appears only in Ezra 10:33, where he is listed among the men who married foreign women.

=== Jeriah ===
See Jerijah.

=== Jerioth ===
Jerioth ירעות "Tent Curtains" was a wife of Caleb according to 1 Chronicles 2:18.

=== Jeriel ===
Jeriel (יְרִיאֵל "taught by God"), son of Tola, son of Issachar, is found in a genealogy of the Tribe of Issachar in 1 Chronicles 7:2.

=== Jerijah ===
Jerijah (sometimes Jeriah) (יְרִיָּה "taught by YHWH"), a Kohathite Levite, is listed as one of the sons of Hebron when David organized the service in genealogical passages in 1 Chronicles 23:19, 24:23, 26:31.

=== Jeroham ===
There are 5 people in the Hebrew Bible named Jeroham (יְרֹחָם "showing pity").

1. The Father of Elkanah, and grandfather of the prophet Samuel — in 1 Samuel 1:1.
2. The father of Azareel, the "captain" of the tribe of Dan — in 1 Chronicles 27:22.
3. A Benjamite mentioned in 1 Chronicles 12:7 and 1 Chronicles 9:12.
4. The father of Azariah, one of the "commanders of the hundreds" who formed part of Jehoiada's campaign to restore the kingship to Joash in 2 Chronicles 23:1
5. A priest mentioned in 1 Chronicles 9:12; (perhaps the same as in Nehemiah 11:12).

=== Jerusha ===
Jerusha (or Jerushah) (יְרוּשָׁא "dispossessor") the daughter of Zadok and the wife of king Uzziah was, according to the 2 Kings 15:33 and 2 Chronicles 27:1, the mother of king Jotham.

=== Jesbi ===
See Ishbi-benob

=== Jeshaiah ===
Jeshaiah (יְשַׁעְיָה "YHWH has saved") may refer to multiple figures in the Bible:

1. A descendant of David, the father of Rephaiah, and the son of Hananiah in 1 Chronicles 3:21.
2. One of eight sons of Jeduthun in 1 Chronicles 25:3.
3. For the man in 1 Chronicles 24 and 26 who is sometimes called Jeshaiah, see Jesiah.

=== Jeshebeab ===
Jeshebeab (יֶשֶׁבְאָב "dwelling of the father") was a descendant of Aaron, who was assigned priestly duties by David. Out of the twenty-four, Jeshebeab was the head of the fourteenth lot according to 1 Chronicles 24:13.

=== Jesher ===
Jesher (יֵשֶׁר "upright") the son of Caleb, son of Hezron is mentioned only in 1 Chronicles 2:18.

=== Jeshishai ===
Jeshishai (יְשִׁישָׁי "my old one") is a figure mentioned only once, in passing, in a genealogy of Gad.

=== Jeshohaiah ===
Jeshohaiah (יְשׁוֹחָיָה "YHWH humbles") appears in a list of names of Simeonites. According to Chronicles these Simeonites took pasture-land from descendants of Ham and the Meunim during the time of king Hezekiah. According to Thomas Kelly Cheyne, the name is a corruption of Maaseiah.

=== Jesimiel ===
Jesimiel (יְשִׁימָאֵל "God will place") appears in a list of names of Simeonites of the family of Shimei. According to Chronicles these Simeonites took pasture-land from descendants of Ham and the Meunim during the time of king Hezekiah. According to Thomas Kelly Cheyne, the name is a corruption of Maaseel.

=== Jesui ===
See Ishvi.

=== Jether ===
Jether (יֶתֶר) was the name of 5 biblical individuals:

- Gideon's firstborn mentioned in Judges 8:20 out of all the 70 children he had.
- A father of Amasa which was the "captain" of the host of Judah.
- A Jerahmeelite and son of Jaba mentioned in 1 Chronicles 2:32 who had no children and ends up dying.
- The son of Ezrah mentioned in 1 Chronicles 4:17.
- The father of Jephunneh, Pispah and Ara.

=== Jetheth ===
Jetheth (יְתֵת "a nail") is listed as one of the "chiefs" of Edom, in Genesis 36:41.

=== Jetur ===
Jetur (יְטוּר "enclosed") was the tenth son of Ishmael (Genesis 25:15;1 Chronicles 1:31)

=== Jeuel ===
Jeuel (יְעוּאֵל "God sweeps away") son of Zerah appears in a list of people living in Jerusalem after the end of the Babylonian exile. For four other individuals who are sometimes called "Jeuel" and sometimes "Jeiel," see Jeiel.

=== Jeush ===
Jeush is the name of four or five individuals mentioned in the Hebrew Bible.

- Jeush son of Esau by Oholibamah the daughter of Anah, son of Zibeon the Hivite. A variant manuscript reading, known as Ketiv, calls him Jeish.
- Jeush son of Bilhan, son of Jediael, the son of Benjamin, mentioned in a genealogy which describes the people of the Tribe of Benjamin.
- Jeush son of Eshek, who is mentioned in a genealogy of the Tribe of Benjamin. According to the Encyclopaedia Biblica, this is likely a reference to the same person called Jeush son of Bilhan. The King James Version calls him Jehush.
- Jeush son of Shimei represented a division of Levites according to 1 Chronicles 23:10–11.
- Jeush, the first listed son of king Rehoboam in 2 Chronicles 11:19.

=== Jezer ===
Jezer (יֵצֶר "Jezer") was a son of Naphtali according to Genesis 46:24 and Numbers 26:49. He was one of the 70 persons to migrate to Egypt with Jacob. According to Numbers he was the progenitor of the Jezerites.

=== Jeziah ===
See Izziah.

=== Jezoar ===
Jezoar (Zohar) (צֹחַר) was one of the sons of Helah and Ashur mentioned in 1 Chronicles 4:7.

=== Jezrahiah ===
See Izrahiah.

=== Jezreel ===
One of the sons of the father of Etam according to 1 Chronicles 4:3

=== Jibsam ===
See Ibsam.

=== Jidlaph ===
Jidlaph (יִדְלָף "weeping") was the seventh son of Nahor and Milcah (Genesis 22:22).

=== Jimnah ===
Jimnah, Jimna, or Imnah (יִמְנָה) was a son of Asher according to Genesis 46:17 and Numbers 26:44. He was one of the 70 souls to migrate to Egypt with Jacob.

=== Jishui ===
Jishui was the second son of King Saul, mentioned in Saul's genealogy in 1 Samuel 14:49. He is called Abinadab in 1 Chronicles 8:33 and 9:39.

=== Joahaz ===
For either of the biblical kings names Jehoahaz or Joahaz, see Jehoahaz of Israel or Jehoahaz of Judah.

Joahaz (יוֹאָחָז "YHWH has grasped"), according 2 Chronicles 34:8, was the name of the father of Josiah's scribe Joah.

=== Joarib ===
See Jarib

=== Joash ===
This entry is about the four minor biblical characters named Joash. For the kings named Joash or Jehoash, see Jehoash of Israel and Jehoash of Judah.

Joash, an abbreviated name of Jehoash, is the name of several figures in the Hebrew Bible.

- Joash, an Abiezrite of the Tribe of Manasseh, was the father of Gideon according to Judges 6–8. His family was poor and lived in Ophrah. After Gideon tore down the altar of Baal and cut down the grove, the men of Ophrah sought to kill Gideon. Joash stood against them, saying, "He that will plead for [Baal], let him be put to death whilst it is yet morning: if he be a god, let him plead for himself, because one hath cast down his altar."
- A Joash is described as "the king's son" in the time of Ahab. According to Stanley Arthur Cook, it is uncertain whether he was the son of king Ahab, or whether "king's son" was a title used by high officers.
- Joash is described as one of the descendants of Shelah, son of Judah (son of Jacob) in a genealogy of the Tribe of Judah.
- A Joash, son of Shemaah of Gibeah, is named as one of the Benjamite warriors to came to the aid of David when he went to Ziklag.

=== Job ===
This entry is about the minor biblical figure named "Job". For the person who has a book named after them, see Job (biblical figure).
Job or Jashub was a son of Issachar according to Genesis 46:13, Numbers 26:24 and 1 Chronicles 7:1. He was one of the 70 souls to migrate to Egypt with Jacob.

=== Jobab ===
Jobab (יוֹבָב "a desert") is the name of at least five men in the Hebrew Bible.

- A son of Joktan according to Genesis 10:29 and 1 Chronicles 1:23.
- Jobab ben Zerah, a King of Edom according to Genesis 36:33 and 1 Chronicles 1:44.
- King of Madon, located in northern Canaan; one of the kings who fought against Israel and who were routed at Meron in Joshua 11.
- A Benjaminite, son of Shaharaim and Hodesh according to 1 Chronicles 8:9.
- A Benjaminite, son of Elpaal according to 1 Chronicles 8:18.

=== Joed ===
Joed (יוֹעֵד "YHWH is witness") is the name of a man mentioned in passing as being an ancestor of Sallu, a Benjamite in the time of Nehemiah.

=== Joel ===
Joel is the name of several men in the Hebrew Bible:

- A Hebrew Bible book of the prophet Joel, the main theme of which is the coming “Day of the Lord”. The prophet Joel cannot be identified with any of the 12 other figures in the Hebrew Bible who have the same name. He is not mentioned outside the books of Joel and Acts (Ac 2:16). His father, Pethuel (1:1), is also unknown. Judging from his concern with Judah and Jerusalem (see 2:32; 3:1,6,8,16-20), it seems likely that Joel lived in that area.
- The firstborn son of the prophet Samuel and father of Heman the singer. According to 1 Samuel chapter 8, Joel and his brother Abijah were appointed by Samuel to be judges in Beersheba, in the south of Israel, while he continued to judge in Ramah. However, Joel and Abijah "walked not in his ways, but turned aside after lucre, and took bribes, and perverted judgment", prompting the Israelites to demand that Samuel give them a king. Josephus says that "resigning his office to his sons, he divided the people between them, and placed them in Bethel and Beer-sheba", a statement which the Cambridge Bible for Schools and Colleges suggests "is probably his own conjecture".
- An ancestor of Samuel (mentioned in 1 Chr 6:21).
- A Simeonite prince (1 Chr 4:35).
- A Reubenite; father of Shemaiah (1 Chr 5:4–8).
- A Gadite chief (1 Chr 5:12).
- Son of Izrahiah and a chief of Issachar (1 Chr 7:3).
- One of David's mighty men, indicated as the brother of Nathan of Zobah (1 Chr 11:38).
- A Gershonite, a prince in the time of David (Chronicles 15:7; 23:8; 26:22).
- Son of Pedaiah; a Manassite chief in the time of David (1 Chr 27:20).
- A Kohathite in the time of Hezekiah (2 Chr 29:12).
- A son of Nebo who returned with Ezra and one of those who married foreign wives (Ezra 10:43).
- Son of Zichri; a Benjamite overseer after the Exile (Nehemiah 11:9).

=== Joelah ===
Joelah (יוֹעֵאלָה "may he avail") son of Jeroham of Gedor, in 1 Chronicles 12:7, is listed as one of the Benjamite warriors who went to David at Ziklag.

=== Joezer ===
Joezer (יוֹעֶזֶר "YHWH is help"), according to 1 Chronicles 12:6, is the name of one of the Benjamite warriors who came to the aid of David when he went to Ziklag in Philistine territory due to the hostility of king Saul.

=== Jogli ===
Jogli (יׇגְלִי "he is exiled") was the father of Bukki, a prince of the Tribe of Dan. (Num. 34:22)

=== Johanan ===
Johanan (Hebrew: יוחנן "God is merciful") was the name of 6 minor biblical figures in the Hebrew Bible:

- The son of Kareah was among the officers who survived the destruction of Jerusalem and exile of Judeans by the king of Babylon; he warned Gedaliah, the governor, of a plot to kill him, but was ignored. Jeremiah 40 7ff.
- The firstborn of King Josiah through Zebudah his wife. He is briefly mentioned in the Hebrew Bible only in the Book of 1 Chronicles. He could possibly be the same as Jehoahaz of Judah.
- One of the sons of Elioenai which were: Hodaiah, Eliashib, Pelaiah, Akkub, Johanan, Dalaiah, and Anani in 1 Chronicles 3:24.
- In 1 Chronicles 6:9, Johanan was a High Priest of Israel being the son of Azariah and the father of Azariah II at the time of King Solomon.
- According to 1 Chronicles 12:12, Johanan was a Gadite and a mighty warrior who followed David.
- One of the sons of Azgad mentioned in Ezra 8:12.

=== Joiarib ===
Joiarib ("God will contend") is the name of two biblical persons:

- Ancestor of Maaseiah the son of Barukh, who was one of those to resettle Jerusalem after the return from Babylonia. (Neh. 11:5)
- The head of a family of priests at the time of the return from Babylonia. (Neh. 12:6) He was one of the "men of understanding" sent by Ezra to Iddo in order to procure men to minister in the Temple. (Ezr. 8:16) His son was Jedaiah, one of the priests to resettle Jerusalem. (Neh. 11:10) The head of the family at the time of Joiakim was Mattenai. (Neh. 12:19)

=== Jokim ===
Jokim (יוֹקִים "YHWH raises up") is listed as one of the descendants of Shelah, son of Judah (son of Jacob) in 1 Chronicles 4:22.

=== Jonathan ===
==== Jonathan son of Kareah ====
Jonathan (Hebrew: יונתן "God gave") son of Kareah was among the officers who survived the destruction of Jerusalem and exile of Judeans by the king of Babylon; he was brother to Johanan q.v. – Jeremiah 40:8

=== Josedech ===
See Jehozadok

=== Joseph ===
==== Joseph, father of Igal ====
Joseph of the house of Issachar was the father of Igal, a scout sent to Canaan prior to the crossing of the Jordan River according to Numbers 13:7.

=== Joshah ===
Joshah (יוֹשָׁה "YHWH makes equal") son of Amaziah is mentioned only once in the Bible, where is listed among Simeonite leaders in 1 Chronicles 4:34. He is one of several clan leaders who, according to Chronicles, were involved in exterminating the descendants of Ham and the Meunim, and taking their pasture-lands.

=== Joshaviah ===
Joshaviah (יוֹשַׁוְיָה "YHWH makes equal") son of Elnaam is a biblical figure who appears only in 1 Chronicles 11:46, in a listing of David's Mighty Warriors.

=== Joshbekashah ===
Joshbekashah (יׇשְׁבְּקָשָׁה "seated in hardness") appears as one of the sons of Heman in a passage which describes the musicians of the Jerusalem Temple in the time of David.

=== Joshibiah ===
Joshibiah (King James Version spelling Josibiah Hebrew: יוֹשִׁבְיָה "YHWH causes to dwell") is given in 1 Chronicles 4:35 as the father of Jehu, one of the Simeonite clan leaders in the time of Hezekiah who exterminated the descendants of Ham and the Meunim and took their farmland.

=== Joshua ===
==== Joshua the Bethshemite ====
Joshua the Bethshemite was the owner of the field in which the Ark of the Covenant came to rest when the Philistines sent it away on a driverless ox-drawn cart. (1 Samuel 6:14)

==== Joshua the governor of the city ====
Joshua (Hebrew: יהושע yehoshua "God saves") was a city governor of Jerusalem in the time of King Josiah of Judah who gave his name to a gate of the city of Jerusalem. 2 Kings 23:8

=== Josibiah ===
See Joshibiah.

=== Josiphiah ===
Josiphiah (יוֹסִפְיָה "YHWH adds") is a name which appears in a list of returnees from the Babylonian captivity, where "Shelomith son of Josiphiah" is listed as the leader of the 160 men of the "descendants of Bani" who returned to Yehud Medinata in the time of Nehemiah.

=== Jozabad ===
Jozabad (יוֹזָבָד) is the name of several individuals mentioned in the Hebrew Bible. For three other individuals with a similar name, see Jehozabad.

- Jozabad of Gederah is listed as one of David's warriors in 1 Chronicles 12:4.
- Two men named Jozabad from the Tribe of Manasseh are listed as warriors of David in 1 Chronicles 12:20.
- Jozabad, according to 2 Chronicle 31:13, was an overseer in the Temple at Jerusalem in the time of Hezekiah.
- A Jozabad is described as a Levite leader in 2 Chronicles 35:9. This may be the same individual overseeing the Temple in the time of Hezekiah.
- Jozabad son of Joshua is listed as a Levite in the time of Ezra in the time of Ezra 8:33.
- A Levite Jozabad is listed in Ezra 10:22 as having taken a foreign wife.
- A Levite Jozabad is listed as having a foreign wife in Ezra 10:23. This man may be the same as Joshua son of Joshua mentioned above, and/or the same as the two individuals below.
- A Jozabad is listed in Nehemiah 8:7 as one of those who helped explain the law to the people of Yehud Medinata.
- A Jozabad is listed as one of the inhabitants of Jerusalem in Nehemiah 11:16.

=== Jozachar ===
Jozachar (Hebrew: יוֹזָכָר, yozakhar, "God Remembered") or Jozacar, son of Shimeath, was one of the assassins of king Joash of Judah. In 2 Kings 12:21 the Hebrew is יוזבד, yozabad.

=== Jushab-hesed ===
Jushab-hesed (יוּשַׁב חֶסֶד "whose love is returned") is a name which appears in the Hebrew Bible only in 1 Chronicles 3:20, where he is said to be one of the sons of Zerubbabel.

== K ==
=== Kallai ===
Kallai (קַלַּי "swift") is named as ancestral head of the priestly house of Sallai in the time of Jehoiakim, according to Nehemiah 12:20.

=== Karshena ===
See Carshena.

=== Kedar ===
Kedar (קֵדָר "dark"): see Qedarites: Biblical

- Is the second son of Ishmael (Genesis 25:13;1 Chronicles 1:29).

=== Kedemah ===
Kedemah (קֵדְמָה "eastward") was the twelfth and youngest son of Ishmael (Genesis 25:15;1 Chronicles 1:31).

=== Kelal ===
Kelal or Chelal (כְּלָל "completed") is an Israelite listed in Ezra as among those who married foreign women.

=== Kelita ===
Kelita ("maiming") was a Levite who assisted Ezra in expounding the law to the people. (Nehemiah 8:7,10:10) He was also known as Kelaiah. (Ezra 10:23)

=== Kesed ===
Kesed (כֶּשֶׂד "increase") was the fourth son of Nahor and Milcah mentioned in Genesis 22:22. The KJV calls him Chesed instead of Kesed.

=== Kemuel ===
Kemuel was the name of 2 biblical individuals.

- The third son of Nahor and Milcah (Genesis 22:21).
- Prince of the tribe of Ephraim; one of those appointed by Moses to superintend the division of Canaan amongst the tribe (Num. 34:24).

=== Keren-happuch ===
Keren-happuch, sometimes spelled Kerenhappuch, (Hebrew: קֶרֶן הַפּוּךְ "horn of antimony") is the name of Job's third daughter (Job 42:14) who was born after prosperity had returned to him.

=== Keziah ===
Keziah ("Cassia") is the name of Job's second daughter born after his trial.

=== Kimham ===
See Chimham

=== Kolaiah ===
Kolaiah ("voice of Jehovah") is the father of the false prophet Ahab (Jeremiah 29:21). It is also the name of an ancestor of Sallu that settled in Jerusalem after returning from the Babylonian exile (Nehemiah 11:7).

=== Kore ===
Kore (קוֹרֵא) was responsible for distributing the freewill offerings of the Temple in the time of King Hezekiah (2 Chronicles 31:14).

== See also ==
- List of biblical names
- List of burial places of biblical figures
- List of major biblical figures
- List of minor biblical tribes
