= Toldoth =

Toldoth may refer to:

- Toledot, the sixth weekly parashah in the Jewish cycle of Torah reading
- The Judaeo-Spanish name for Toledo, Spain, Spain
