= Dosetai =

Greek male given name

Dosetai is a Hebraized form of the Greek given name Dositheus meaning "gift of God". It was popular in late classical Judea and among Jewish communities in Egypt, and corresponds to the Hebrew "Mattaniah" or "Nethaneel," which seems to have been a favorite one both in Palestine and in Alexandria.

It has been borne by the following:

== Tannaim - Mishnah rabbis ==
=== Dosetai of Kefar Yatma ===
A pupil of Shammai lived in Kefar Yitma, east of modern Ariel, north of Shiloh.

=== Dosetai b. Matun ===
A tanna mentioned in a baraita as the author of an aggadic teaching, which elsewhere is ascribed to Dosetai b. Judah. According to Yoma 30b, an amora, also named Dosetai b. Matun, handed down a teaching of Johanan's; but the correct reading is "Justai b. Matun," which is found in the parallel passage, Zebachim 99a, and is confirmed by the Jerusalem Talmud.

=== Abba Jose b. Dosetai ===
On Abba Jose b. Dosetai see Bacher, "Ag. Tan." ii. 388.

=== Dosetai b. Jannai ===
A tanna of the late 2nd century, known especially as having handed down teachings of Rabbi Meir, Jose ben Halafta, and Eleazer ben Shammua. On a journey to Babylonia he was ill-treated at Nehardea by the Jewish-Persian authorities, and took revenge by giving a satirical description of them. The account of the affair is preserved in two different versions. Examples of Dosetai's humor are to be found in his answers to his pupils' questions on the differences between man and woman, and in his reply to the question why Jerusalem did not have thermæ like Tiberias: "If Jerusalem had warm springs, the pilgrims coming up for the feasts would have dwelt on the pleasures of the baths offered them, instead of considering how best to fulfill the regulations for the pilgrimage". The words of Ecclesiastes 11:6 ("In the morning sow thy seed," etc.) he explained as a reminder to the farmer to be diligent in his sowing and planting. In another teaching he showed how the person who does not work during the six weekdays will soon find himself compelled to work on Shabbat. One of Dosetai's sermons praises almsgiving, interpreting Psalms 17:15 thus: "Through charity shall I see thy face, and enjoy thy sight on awakening".

=== In legend ===
- In a later Midrashic legend, Dosetai b. Jannai is the name of one of the two teachers (the other is rabbi Jannai) sent by the Assyrian king to convert the pagans who had settled in Eretz Israel (later on, the Samaritans). The name was probably suggested by its similarity to that of the Samaritan etc. of the Dositheans.

=== Dosetai b. Judah ===
A tanna of the late 2nd century CE. Several of his halakhic teachings are recorded. and he transmitted those of Shimon bar Yochai. Once Dosetai's opinion was opposed to that of Judah ha-Nasi, the patriarch. Four interpretations of Deuteronomy 32 bear his name.

=== Dosetai of Kokaba ===
A contemporary of Rabbi Meir. He asked Meir what was meant by the verse, "The belly of the wicked shall want", and Meir answered by relating an incident characteristic of the pagan's vain and intemperate love of pleasure. According to another version of this story, Meir was the questioner and Dosetai the narrator. It is unnecessary to assume that "Dosetai" is here a generic term, meaning a Dosithean.

== Amoras - Talmud rabbis in the Land of Israel ==
=== Dosetai ===
The father of Apotriki or Patriki, perhaps the same Patriki or Patrik who is mentioned as the brother of Derosa.

=== Dosetai the Elder ===
Dosetai the Elder is mentioned with a younger Dosetai. He is probably the Dosetai frequently referred to in midrashic literature as having handed down the teachings of Samuel b. Naḥman and of Levi.

=== Dosetai of Biri ===
An amora who lived in the Land of Israel of the early 4th century. Ulla, a native of Biri (thought to be Baram) in Galilee, once addressed a halakhic question to him. The Babylonian Talmud contains three interpretations of Scripture from Dosetai's sermons, which were perhaps handed down in the schools of Babylon by Ulla, who had emigrated from the Land of Israel. One of these refers to Numbers 10:36; another, to I Samuel 22:1 et seq.; while the third is an original exposition showing how David (in Psalms 19:13 et seq.) gradually begs forgiveness for his sins, like a Samaritan peddler unfolding his wares one after the other. Palestinian sources do not mention Dosetai of Biri.
