= Wives of Esau =

Two differing lists of Esau's wives are recorded in the Book of Genesis. Genesis 26:34-35 and 28:8-9 report his marriages, and Genesis 36:1-42 provides a genealogy of Esau including his wives and their descendants. Basemath's name is mentioned twice.

== Biblical accounts ==
His first two wives were Canaanites, bringing "bitterness of spirit" to his parents, Isaac and Rebecca.

Some Biblical scholars believed that Esau changed the names of two wives to the Hebrew to pacify his parents:

- Judith, daughter of Beeri the Hittite, also a Canaanite (Genesis 26:34–35);
- Basemath (No.1), Canaanite (Genesis 26:34–35) = Adah (Genesis 36:2,3), the daughter of Elon the Hittite;
- Oholibamah, also written Oholibamah (Genesis 36:2,3), a Hivite, also a Canaanite;
- Mahalath (Genesis 28:9) = Bashemath (No.2) (Genesis 36:2,3), Esau's cousin and third wife, daughter of Ishmael.

Genesis 26:34–35 describes Esau's marriage at the age of forty to two Canaanite women: Judith, the daughter of Beeri the Hittite, and Basemath. This arrangement grieved his parents. Upon seeing that his brother was blessed and that their father rejected Esau's union to Canaanites, Esau went to the house of his uncle Ishmael and married his cousin, Mahalath the daughter of Ishmael, and sister of Nebaioth. Esau's family is again revisited in Genesis 36: this passage names two Canaanite wives; Adah, the daughter of Elon the Hittite, and Aholibamah, the daughter of Anah, daughter of Zibeon the Hivite, and a third: Bashemath, Ishmael's daughter, sister of Nebaioth. Some scholars equate the three wives mentioned in Genesis 26 and 28 with those in Genesis 36. Casting his lot with the Ishmaelites, he was able to drive the Horites out of Mount Seir to settle in that region. According to some views, Esau is considered to be the progenitor not only of the Edomites but of the Kenizzites and the Amalekites as well.

== Interpretation ==
Josephus suggests that Esau's marriages caused grief to his parents because in marrying, he "took upon himself the authority, and pretending to have dominion over his own marriages, without so much as asking the advice of his father".

Reuven Chaim Klein summarizes how the various Medieval Jewish commentators broadly provide four interpretations to address the inconsistency between the accounts of Esau's wives in Genesis 26 and Genesis 36:

- Rashi suggests that the three women listed are all the same individuals, but referred to by different names.
- Sefer ha-Yashar and several other commentators largely agree with Rashi, but assert that Esau had four wives, as they do not equate Judith with Aholibamah.
- Nahmanides generally concurs, adding that Adah, daughter of Elon the Hittite, and Basemath, daughter of Elon the Hittite, were sisters, not the same person, thus proposing that Esau had five wives.
- Abraham Maimuni, however, completely rejects the idea of the Bible using different names for the same individuals. He posits that the three wives mentioned in Genesis 26 and the three in Genesis 36 are entirely different people, concluding that Esau had six wives in total.

In Midrash and Aggadah there is more context and background on the lives of Esau's wives.
