= Korah (son of Esau) =

Biblical personage

Korah or Kórach (Hebrew: קֹרַח), son of Esau, is an individual who is described in the Book of Genesis in the Hebrew Bible.

== Biblical narrative ==
According to the Genesis 36:5, Korah was the son of Esau and Aholibamah, and had two brothers, Jeush and Jaalam. Verses 6 to 8 record that Esau and "his wives, his sons, [and] his daughters" moved from Canaan to Mount Seir, and settled there.

In Genesis 36:14, Korah's mother, Aholibamah, is recorded as the daughter of Anah and granddaughter of Zibeon, making Zibeon Korah's maternal great-grandfather. The same verse repeats verse 5 and names his two brothers again.

Anah, in Genesis 36:2,14,18, and 25, is the same as the Anah, the son of Zibeon in verse 24. Verses 2 and 14 refer to "Aholibamah the daughter of Anah, the daughter of Zibeon the Hivite". There is some confusion in the wording: see the article on Esau's wives for a discussion of the issues.

Verses 15-19 refer to "the chiefs of the sons of Esau" and refer twice to "chief Korah":

^{15} These are the chiefs of the sons of Esau. The sons of Eliphaz, the firstborn of Esau, are chief Teman, chief Omar, chief Zepho, chief Kenaz, ^{16} chief Korah, chief Gatam, and chief Amalek. These are the chiefs descended from Eliphaz in the land of Edom; these are the sons of Adah. ^{17} And these are the sons of Reuel, Esau's son: chief Nahath, chief Zerah, chief Shammah, and chief Mizzah. These are the chiefs descended from Reuel in the land of Edom; these are the sons of Esau's wife Basemath. ^{18} And these are the sons of Esau's wife Oholibamah: chief Jeush, chief Jalam, and chief Korah. These are the chiefs descended from Esau's wife Oholibamah, the daughter of Anah. ^{19} These are the sons of Esau (that is, Edom), and these are their chiefs.

The reference to chief Korah is omitted in the Samaritan Pentateuch, and H. E. Ryle suggests that the inclusion is an error, directing readers to the Korah named in verse 18.

== Other individuals named Korah ==
Korah, son of Izhar, is a better known individual, who appears in the Book of Numbers.
