= Yudin =

Yudin/Judin (male) and Yudina/Judina (female) (Russian: Юдин, Юдина) are Russian surnames derived from the name Yuda, a Russified version of the former calendar name Jude (given after Jude the Apostle), no longer in use. Also adopted by Jews following the Partitions of Poland, in reference to a village name Yudino or meaning "the son/daughter of Jude".

Notable people with the surname include:

- Aleksandr Yudin (1949–1986), Russian cyclist and Olympics competitor
- Andrey Yudin, several people
- Benjamin P. Yudin (1928–1983), Kazakhstani oriental studies scholar, historian, philologist, Persian and Turkic manuscript expert, researcher, and teacher
- Benjamin Yudin (born 1944), American Orthodox rabbi and instructor
- Dmitry Yudin (born 1995), Russian ice hockey player
- Erik Yudin (1930–1976), Russian philosopher, cybernetician, and Soviet dissident
- Gennadi Yudin (1923–1989), Russian actor
- Igor Yudin (born 1987), Russian-born Australian volleyball player and Olympics competitor
- Igor Yudin (alpine skier) (1957–2007), Belarusian skier and Olympics competitor
- Ivan Yudin (born 1990), Russian footballer
- Jānis Judiņš (a.k.a. Yan Yudin, 1884–1918), Latvian Red Riflemen commander
- Konstantin Yudin (1896–1957), Russian film director and screenwriter
- Larisa Yudina (1945–1998), Russian journalist and newspaper editor
- Lyubov Yudina (born 1981), Russian swimmer and Olympics competitor
- Maria Yudina (1899–1970), Russian classical pianist
- Mikhail Yudin (footballer) (1976–2020), Russian footballer
- Mikhail Yudin (serial killer) (born 1975), Russian construction worker and murderer
- Nikolai Yudin (1898–after 1966), Russian historian of religion
- Pavel Yudin (1899–1968), Russian Soviet philosopher, diplomat, and Communist party figure
- Sergei Yudin (surgeon) (1891–1954), Russian surgeon, military doctor, inventor, academician, and blood transfusion pioneer
- Sergei Yudin (tenor) (1889–1963), Russian operatic tenor
- Stepan Yudin (born 1980), Russian race walker
- Vitali Yudin (born 1974), Russian footballer
- Vlad Yudin (born 1982), Russian documentary filmmaker
- Yelena Yudina (born 1988), Russian skeleton racer
- Yuri Yudin (1937–2013), Russian hiker, known from the Dyatlov Pass incident

== See also ==
- Yudkin
