= Yudkin =

Yudkin, feminine: Yudkina is an Eastern Ashkenazi Jewish surname derived from the belittling diminutive Yudka, either from male Yuda or female Judith. Notable people with the surname include:

- Aleksei Yudkin (born 1981), Russian footballer
- John Yudkin (1910–1995), British physiologist and nutritionist
- Jonathan Yudkin (born 1960), American musician, record producer, arranger, and band leader
- Khrystyna Yudkina (born 1984), Ukrainian racewalking athlete
- Richard Yudkin (1919–2004), United States Air Force officer

== See also ==
- Yudin
