= Basmat =

Basmat may refer to:

- Basemath, name of three women in Old Testament
- Basmath, a taluka in Parbhani district in Indian state of Maharashtra
