= Zibeon =

Biblical figure/s in Genesis and Chronicles

Zibeon (Heb. צבעוֹן, Tsibon': 'dyed' (Gesen.) or 'robber' (Fürst); Sept. Σεβεγών; Vulg. Sebeon) is one or perhaps two biblical figures mentioned in the Book of Genesis and the First Book of Chronicles.

According to the Book of Genesis, Zibeon was the father of Anah, whose daughter Aholibamah was Esau's wife, before 1963 BC according to the Ussher chronology. Although called a Hivite, he may be the same as Zibeon the son of Seir the Horite who is mentioned in the First Book of Chronicles, with Horite signifying 'cave-dweller' and Hivite being the name of his tribe, for nothing is known of any race of the Troglodytes; or perhaps הִחַוַּי ('the Hivite') is a mis-transcription for הִחֹרַי ('the Horite').

Another difficulty connected with this Zibeon is that Anah in Genesis is called his daughter, and his son; but this difficulty may perhaps be explained by supposing that בת refers to Aholibamah, and not to the name next preceding it. The Samaritan, it should be observed, has בן. An allusion is made to some unrecorded fact in the history of the Horites in the passage "This [was that] Anah that found the mules in the wilderness as he fed the asses of Zibeon his father". The word rendered 'mules' in the Authorized Version is the Hebrew יֵמַים, yemim, perhaps the Emim, or giants, as in the reading of the Samuel הָאֵימַים, and so also Onkelos and Pseudo-Jonathan; Gesenius prefers 'hot-springs', following the Vulgate rendering. Zibeon was also one of the dukes or phylarchs of the Horites.

== See also ==
- Esau
- Beeri
- Anath

== Sources ==
- Smith, L. E. (1881). "Zibeon". In McClintock, John; Strong, James (eds.). Cyclopædia of Biblical, Theological and Ecclesiastical Literature. Vol. 10.—Su–Z. New York: Haper & Brothers. p. 1091.
