= Jaalam (name) =

Jaalam (Hebrew: יַעְלָם Ya‘lām, 'Jah conceals') is a name from the Bible and also a Hebrew masculine name. It has many meanings including: to be hidden; a young man; counselor; heir. The name is transliterated in a variety of ways in English including Yalam, Jalam and Yaalam.

In the Bible, Jaalam was born to Aholibamah and Esau in Canaan. He had two brothers, Jeush and Korah. This story is described in Genesis 36:5.
