= Deborah (Genesis) =

Human biblical figure (Genesis 35)

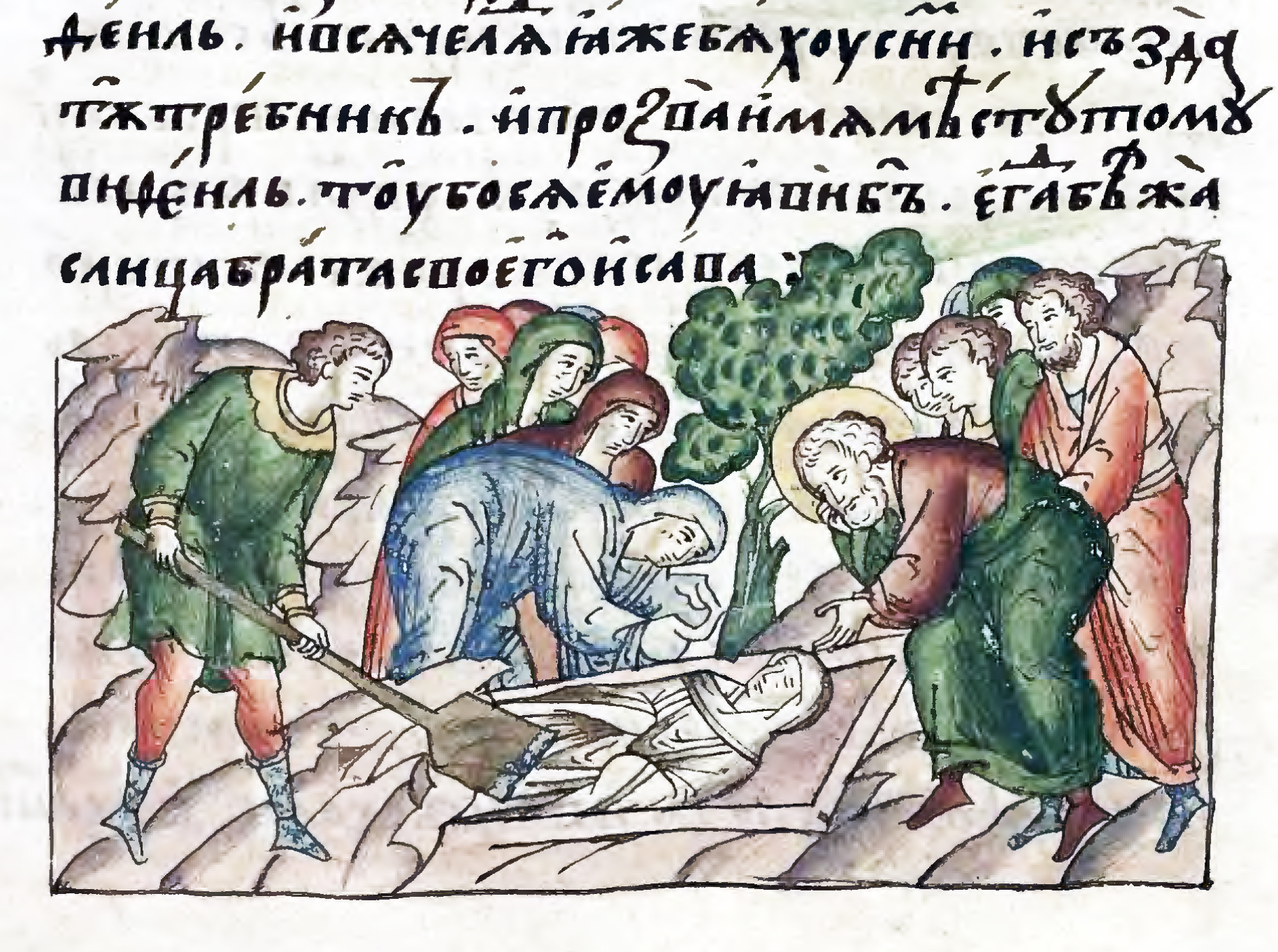
Funerals of Deborah

Deborah (Hebrew: דְּבוֹרָה Deborah) appears in the Torah (part of the Hebrew Bible) as the nurse of Rebecca, the wife of Isaac (Genesis 35:8). The narrative states that she dies while her son Jacob and his family are in Bethel for religious reasons. She is buried under an oak below Bethel and in consequence the place is named Allon Bachuth (אלון בכות), meaning "Oak of Weeping". An "old family servant" who leaves Laban's house in Paddan Aram with Rebecca when she travels to Canaan is mentioned in Genesis 24:59; she may also have been Deborah. She may have been the nurse who "brought up" Rebecca as a child: for example the Holman Christian Standard Bible refers to her as "Deborah, the one who had nursed and raised Rebekah" and adds a note stating that she was "Rebekah's wet nurse".

In Judges 4:5, a tree is referred to as the "palm-tree of Deborah", which has been identified by some with the "Oak of Weeping".

== In Rabbinical literature ==
According to the Aggadah, the word "allon" is the Greek ἄλλον (another); and it explains the designation of the burial-place of Deborah as "another weeping" by stating that before Jacob had completed his mourning for Deborah, he received the news of the death of his mother, Rebecca. It claims scripture does not mention the place of Rebecca's interment, because her burial took place privately, but Genesis 49:31 specifically states she was interred in the Cave of Machpelah. Isaac was blind; Jacob was away from home; and his brother Esau would have been the only one to mourn; and his public appearance as sole mourner would not have been to Rebecca's honor.

== Rashi ==
According to Rashi, Deborah was sent by Laban to care for his sister Rebecca when the latter went to marry Isaac (Genesis 24:59). After Rebecca's son Jacob had been away from home for 22 years, Rebecca dispatched her loyal nurse to tell Jacob that it was safe for him to return home. The elderly nurse delivered her message and died on the return journey.

== In the Book of Jasher ==
According to the Book of Jasher, Deborah was the daughter of Uz, who was the first son of Milcah and Nahor. Deborah joined Rebecca, her cousin, on her journey to marry Isaac. Rebecca later sent Deborah with two of Isaac's servants to Haran to find Jacob and ask him to return to his father's house in the land of Canaan. She remained in Haran with Jacob and stayed to tend to his wives and children, while the other servants returned. Later, God told Jacob to move to Bethel and make an altar, and Deborah died there and was buried under an oak.
