= Korach =

Korach may refer to:

- Korah, son of Izhar, leader of a rebellion against Moses recounted in Numbers 16
- Korah (son of Esau), a biblical character mentioned in Genesis 36:5
- Korach (parsha), the 38th weekly Torah portion in the annual Jewish cycle of Torah reading

== People with the surname ==
- Ken Korach (born 1952), play-by-play announcer for the Oakland Athletics
