= Jaakan =

Jaakan (Anglicized, já-a-kan; also Jakan, see KJV), meaning "he twists", is a Hebrew name and a minor character in the Hebrew Bible. In Hebrew manuscripts of Genesis and in many Hebrew and Septuagint manuscripts of Chronicles he appears as Akan, also spelled 'Akan. He is listed as one of the sons of Ezer (Genesis 36:27, 1 Chr. 1:42), son of Seir the Horite (Genesis 36:21, 1 Chronicles 1:42).

There is also a reference to a location, Be'eroth Bene-Jaakan, the 'wells of the children of Jaakan', in Numbers 33:31–32 and Deuteronomy 10:6, a place where the Israelites camped on their Exodus journey from Egypt to the Promised Land.
