= Reuel =

Reuel or Raguel (Hebrew: רְעוּאֵל, romanized: Rəʿūʾēl; Edomite: 𐤓𐤏𐤀𐤋 rʿʾl), meaning "God shall pasture" or more specifically "El shall pasture" (as a shepherd does with his flock) is a Hebrew name associated with several biblical and religious figures.

== Biblical figures ==
Biblical persons with this name are:

- A son of Esau and Mahalath, the father of Nahath, Zerah, Shammah, and Mizzah (Genesis 36:4,10; 1 Chronicles 1:35)
- Moses' father-in-law, also named as Jethro and Hobab (Judges 4:11, Exodus 2:18; Numbers 10:29).
- A Gadite (Numbers 2:14), called also Deuel (Hebrew: דְּעוּאֵל, Modern: Dəʿūʾēl, Tiberian: Dŭʿūʾēl) (Numbers 1:14; 7:42); the father of the Gadite prince Eliasaph
- A Benjamite (1 Chronicles 9:7–8)
- Father-in-law of Tobias (Tobit 7:1–15)

== Other people ==
=== First name ===
- Reuel Abraham (1924–1995), Nazi Luftwaffe pilot and Jewish convert
- Reuel Denney (1913–1995), American poet and academic
- Reuel Marc Gerecht, American writer and political analyst
- Reuel Colt Gridley (1829–1870), American storekeeper and Civil War fundraiser
- Reuel Lochore (1903–1991), New Zealand public servant and scholar
- Reuel Emanuel "Raz" Mesinai (born 1973), American record producer and composer
- Reuel Williams (1783–1862), American politician from Maine

=== Middle name ===
- Jairus Aquino (born 1999), Filipino actor
- James Reuel Smith (1852–1935), American photographer and amateur historian.
- John Ronald Reuel Tolkien (1892–1973), English writer
- Christopher Tolkien (1924–2020), son and literary executor of J. R. R. Tolkien
- Simon Tolkien (born 1959), writer and grandson of J. R. R. Tolkien

=== Patronymic ===
- Sophas, son of Raguel (1st century), 'of royal lineage', executed during the Jewish Revolt by John, son of Dorcas

== Landmark houses ==
- Capt. Reuel and Lucy Merrill House, Cumberland Center, Maine
- Reuel E. Smith House, Skaneateles, New York

== Other ==
- Raguel (angel) – one of the seven archangels in the rabbinic tradition and the Kabbalah
