= Andrey Yudin =

Andrey Yudin or Andriy Yudin may refer to:

- Andrei Yudin, Russian military officer, commander of the Russian Air Force
- Andrey Yudin (trampoline gymnast) (born 1996), Russian gymnast and Olympics competitor
- Andrey Yuryevich Yudin (born 1967), Russian futsal player and coach
- Andriy Yudin (born 1967), Ukrainian footballer and coach
