= Andrey Yuryevich Yudin =

Russian futsal player and coach

Andrey Yudin
Personal information
- Full name: Andrey Yuryevich Yudin
- Date of birth: 11 June 1967 (age 59)
- Place of birth: Russia
- Position: Defender

Team information
- Current team: Dina Moscow (manager)

Senior career*
Years	Team	Apps	(Gls)
1991–1999	Dina Moscow	138	(47)
1999–2001	Delta-Dina		
2001–2002	Turan Air		

International career
1992	CIS	2	(0)

Managerial career
- 2001–2002: Turan Air
- 2002–2005: Arbat
- 2005–2006: Dina
- 2006–2007: Dina
- 2007–2008: Azerbaijan
- 2008–2009: Dina
- 2009–: Dina Moscow
- * Club domestic league appearances and goals

Andrey Yuryevich Yudin (born 11 June 1967) is a former Russian futsal player and current head coach of Dina Moscow. He was also a part of the CIS futsal team.

== Biography ==
Yudin is a graduate of the “Medik” sports academy. He started his futsal career in “Moslift”, where he spent two years. He joined Dina Moscow in 1991. After eight successful seasons in Dina he became eight-time champion of Russian Super League. He won Russian Futsal Cup for six times, European Clubs Championship for three times and Intercontinental Cup. Unlike the majority of his teammates, he played only two games for the CIS futsal team. In 1999 Yudin became the Dina Moscow reserve team playing coach. Then he moved to Azerbaijan Premier League. As a part of “Turan Air” he became Azerbaijan League champion and took part in UEFA Futsal Cup. Andrey coached Arbat Moscow for three years and then returned to Dina Moscow. In the 2007/2008 season he coached the Azerbaijan national team.

== Honours ==
- Russian Futsal Super League Winner (7): 1992/93, 1993/94, 1994/95, 1995/96, 1996/97, 1997/98, 1998/99
- Russian Futsal Cup Winner (6): 1992, 1993, 1995, 1996, 1997, 1998
- European Clubs Championship Winner (3): 1995, 1997, 1999
- Intercontinental Cup (1): 1997
- Russian Super League Cup (1): 1995
- Azerbaijan Premier League Winner (1): 2001/02
