= Mahalath =

Third mentioned wife of Esau in the Book of Genesis

Mahalath is mentioned in the Book of Genesis as the third wife of Esau and the daughter of Ishmael and sister of Nebaioth.

== History ==
=== Genesis ===
The biblical narrative states that Esau took Mahalath from the house of Ishmael to be his wife, after seeing that his Canaanite wives (Basemath and Judith) displeased his father, Isaac.

Esau sought this union with a non-Canaanite in an effort to reconcile his relationship with his parents, namely with his father Isaac, whose blessing he sought (Genesis 28:6–9). However, there is no record of his parents' approval for the union of Esau and Mahalath.

In Genesis 36:2,3, on the other hand, Esau's three wives are differently named; his family is mentioned as consisting of two Canaanite wives, Adah, the daughter of Elon the Hittite, and Aholibamah, and a third: Bashemath, Ishmael's daughter. Some scholars equate the three wives mentioned in Genesis 26 and 28 with those mentioned in Genesis 36, in the following way:

- Basemath (Genesis 26:34–35) is Adah (Genesis 36:2,3), the daughter of Elon the Hittite;
- Judith (Genesis 26:34–35) is Aholibamah (Genesis 36:2,3), also a Canaanite;
- Mahalath (Genesis 28:9) is Bashemath (Genesis 36:2,3), Esau's cousin and third wife, daughter of Ishmael.

Nonetheless, other scholars dispute these connections.

Basemath and Esau had one reported son, Reuel.

=== Talmud ===
Mahalath is mentioned both in the Babylonian (Megillah 17a) and Jerusalem (Bikkurim 3:3) Talmud. Pesachim 112b introduces a demon named Agrat, who is the daughter of Mahalath.

=== Midrash ===
Midrashic literature features Mahalath, like Bereshit Rabbah 67 and 82, Shemot Rabbah 1 and Aggadat Bereshit 46. Mahalath is again mentioned as the mother of Agrat in Bamidbar Rabbah.

=== Kabbalah ===
In Kabbalistic literature, Mahalath is transformed into a mother of demons. She is the daughter of Ishmael, and mate of Esau, Igratiel or the demon Samael, Esau's "heavenly patron", depending on the source. Her daughter is Agrat.
