= Hivites =

Group of descendants of Canaan

The Hivites (Biblical Hebrew: חִוִּים, romanized: Ḥiwwim) were one group of descendants of Canaan, son of Ham, according to the Generations of Noah in the Book of Genesis 10:17. A variety of proposals have been made, but beyond the references in the Hebrew Bible to Hivites in Canaan, no consensus has been reached about their precise historical identity.

== Etymology ==
E. C. Hostetter has proposed that the name comes from "tent-dweller," as a cognate to the Hebrew word hawwah (חַוָּה), which means tent-camp, although this proposal is rejected by John Day.

No name resembling Hivite has been found in Egyptian or Mesopotamian inscriptions, though the Hiyawa in a Luvian-Phoenician bilingual has been linked to the Biblical Hiwwi.

== Location ==
The Hivites, according to the Book of Joshua, lived in the hilly region of Lebanon from Lebo Hamath (Judges 3:3) to Mount Hermon (Joshua 11:3). Hivites are also mentioned further south in the Masoretic Text of the Hebrew Bible, which assigns to Hivites the towns of Gibeon, Kephirah, Beeroth, and Kiriath-Jearim (Joshua 9:17). However, the Septuagint reads these four towns as inhabited by Horites, suggesting that the name Hivite may have entered the Masoretic Text via a spelling error.

The Masoretic Text of Joshua 11:3 described the Hivites as being "under Hermon in the land of Mizpeh." However, the Septuagint reads "Hittites" in place of "Hivites," suggesting that one text or the other has suffered an error.

Similarly in 2 Samuel 24:7 according to the Masoretic Text, Hivites are mentioned immediately after "the stronghold of Tyre," where the Septuagint once again reads "Hittites."

== Biblical mentions ==
Within the Hebrew Bible, Hivites are often listed among the inhabitants of Canaan, promised to the descendants of Abraham. Genesis 36:2, in the Masoretic Text, mentions that one of Esau's wives was "Oholibamah the daughter of Anah, the daughter of Zibeon the Hivite" who is also described as "of the daughters of Canaan". However, textual evidence from the Septuagint and Genesis 36:20 suggest that Zibeon was originally referred to not as a Hivite, but a Horite.

The Book of Joshua claims that Hivites were one of seven groups living in the land of Canaan when the Israelites under Joshua commenced their conquest of the land (Joshua 3:10). These seven nations were to be exterminated: Hittites, Girgashites, Amorites, Canaanites, Perizzites, Hivites and Jebusites. In Joshua 9, Joshua enslaved the Hivites of Gibeon to be wood gatherers and water carriers for the Temple of YHWH (see Nethinim).

The Bible records that David's census included Hivite cities. During the reign of Solomon, they are described as part of the slave labor for his many building projects. It is not clear if, when or how they ceased to be a separate group before the Israelite kingdoms came to an end.

Medieval Jewish exegetes like Nachmanides and Radak have suggested that the Hivvites are the same as the Rephaim, which explains why the two names never appear together in Biblical lists of Canaanite tribes. Nonetheless, this assumption has been question by later scholars. Others have argued that the Rephaim were not strictly Canaanite, but their land was nonetheless promised to Abraham.

== See also ==
- Mizpah in Gilead (Joshua), where the Hivites were said to live
