= Vitali Yudin =

Russian footballer

Personal information
- Date of birth: 17 June 1974 (age 52)
- Height: 1.74 m (5 ft 8 1/2 in)
- Position: Midfielder

Youth career
- UOR Volgograd

Senior career*
Years	Team	Apps	(Gls)
1991–1992	FC Tekstilshchik Kamyshin	4	(0)
1992	→ FC Tekstilshchik-d Kamyshin (loan)	16	(0)
1992	FC Vympel Rybinsk	9	(0)
1993–1994	FC Zvezda Gorodishche	38	(2)
- * Club domestic league appearances and goals

Vitali Yudin (Russian: Виталий Юдин; born 17 June 1974) is a former Russian football player.

Yudin played in the 1992 Russian Top League with FC Tekstilshchik Kamyshin.
