= Ivan Yudin =

Russian footballer

Personal information
- Full name: Ivan Ivanovich Yudin
- Date of birth: 13 May 1990 (age 36)
- Place of birth: Anapa, Russian SFSR
- Height: 1.76 m (5 ft 9 1/2 in)
- Positions: Defender; midfielder

Senior career*
Years	Team	Apps	(Gls)
2009	FC Krasnodar-2		
2010	FC Druzhba Maykop	22	(0)
2011–2012	FC Slavyansky Slavyansk-na-Kubani	29	(3)
2012–2014	FC Torpedo Armavir	41	(1)
2014–2016	FC Afips Afipsky	52	(0)
2016–2017	FC Sochi	27	(2)
2017–2019	FC Chernomorets Novorossiysk	52	(5)
- * Club domestic league appearances and goals

Ivan Ivanovich Yudin (Russian: Иван Иванович Юдин; born 13 May 1990) is a Russian former professional football player.

== Club career ==
On 7 June 2019, Russian Football Union banned him from football activity for three years after he allegedly accepted a bribe for ensuring that his team FC Chernomorets Novorossiysk loses to FC Chayka Peschanokopskoye.
