= Basemath =

Biblical figure

Basemath (Hebrew: בָּשְׂמַת, Modern: Basmat, Tiberian: Bāsəmaṯ, "Sweet-smelling", Arabic: بسمة; "Sweet-smile"), in the Hebrew Bible, is the name of two different wives of Esau, the brother of Jacob.

== Biblical references ==
In Genesis 26:34–35, Basemath is the name of the first wife of Esau. She was the daughter of Elon the Hittite. Basemath was a Canaanite: in marrying her, and also his second wife, Judith, he ignored God's wishes that Abraham's descendants keep themselves separate from the Canaanites in marriage. His marriages, therefore, brought bitterness to Isaac and Rebekah.

Esau is then said to have taken as his third wife a daughter of his uncle Ishmael, Mahalath.

In Genesis 36:2,3, on the other hand, Esau's three wives are differently named; his family is mentioned as composed of two Canaanite wives, Adah, the daughter of Elon the Hittite, and Aholibamah, and a third, Bashemath, described as Ishmael's daughter (and therefore from among Abraham's descendants).

Some scholars equate the three wives mentioned in Genesis 26 and 28 with those in Genesis 36 in the following way:

- Basemath (Genesis 26:34–35) = Adah (Genesis 36:2,3), the daughter of Elon the Hittite;
- Judith (Genesis 26:34–35) = Aholibamah (Genesis 36:2,3), also a Canaanite;
- Mahalath (Genesis 28:9) = Bashemath (Genesis 36:2,3), Esau's cousin and third wife, daughter of Ishmael.

The names Basemath and Bashemath are equated by the Jewish Encyclopedia, which also observes that text of the Samaritan Torah "avoids the conflict between the different narratives by substituting Mahalath for Bashemath" in Genesis 36.

== See also ==
- Wives of Esau
