= Mount Seir =

Mountainous region stretching between the Dead Sea and the Gulf of Aqaba

Coordinates: 30.1843°N 35.3166°E

Al-Sharāh Mountains shown in red in South-West Jordan (Shaubak/Mt. Se'ir)

Mount Seir (Note: Hebrew: הַר-שֵׂעִיר, romanized: Har Sēʿīr) is the ancient and biblical name for a mountainous region stretching between the Dead Sea and the Gulf of Aqaba in the northwestern region of Edom, southeast of the Kingdom of Judah. It may also have marked the older historical limit of Ancient Egypt in Canaan. A place called "Seir, in the land of Shasu", (Note: tꜣ-šꜣsw sʿr – ta-Shasu seʿer) thought to be near Petra, Jordan, is listed in the temple of Amenhotep III at Soleb (ca. 1380 BC).

The Nabataean equivalent is šrʾ, and the modern Arabic equivalent is thought to be al-Sharat, (Note: Arabic: جبال الشراة, romanized: Jibāl ash-Sharāh, lit. 'Mountains of Sharāh') in Jordan.

== Hebrew Bible ==
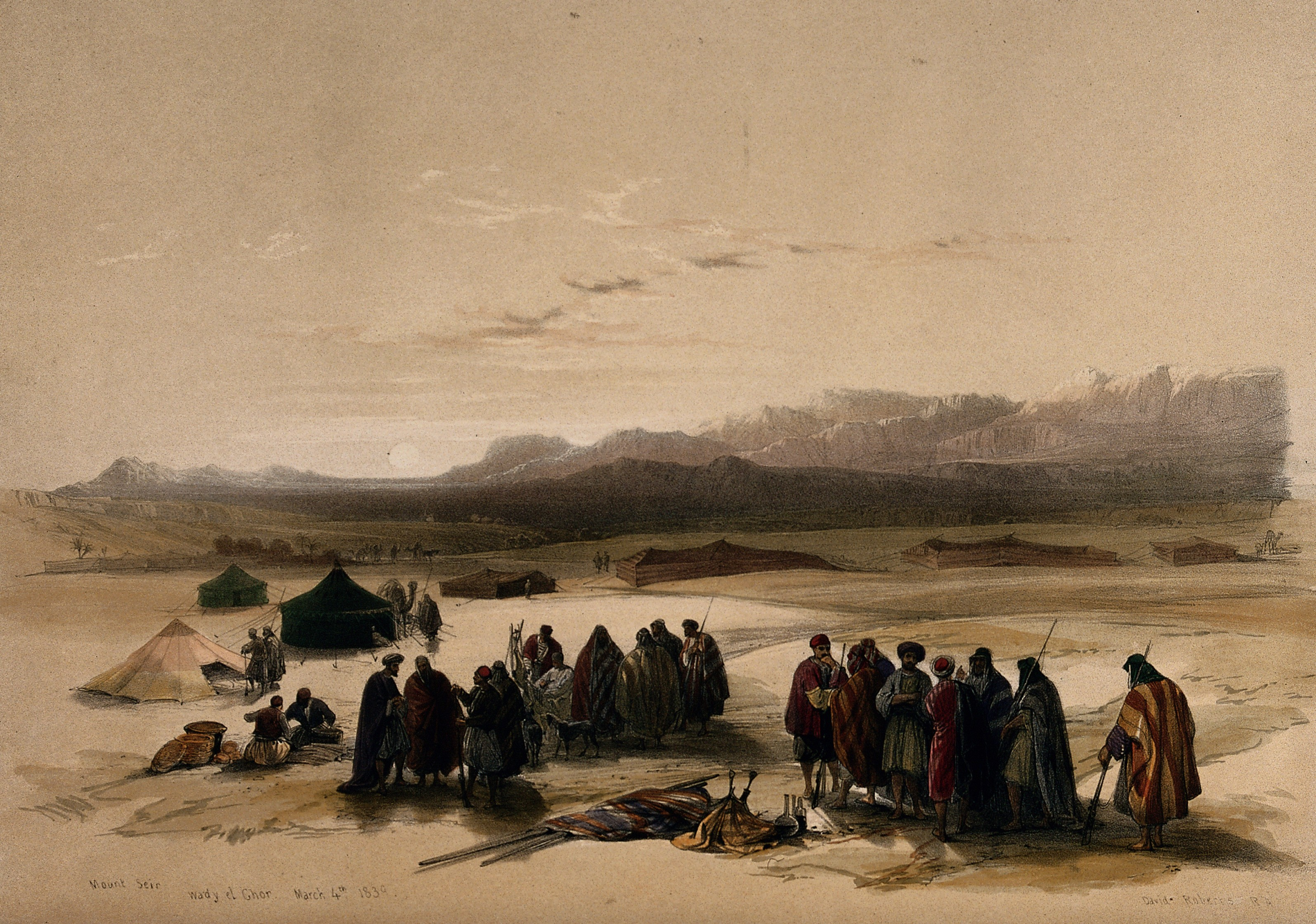
Desert camp, with Mount Seir in the distance, 1839

The Hebrew Bible mentions two distinct geographical areas named Seir: a "land of Seir" and "Mount Seir" in the South, bordered by the Arabah to the west; and another "Mount Seir", which is further north, on the northern boundary of Judah, mentioned in the Book of Joshua (Joshua 15:10).

=== Southern land of Seir, Mount Seir ===
Mount Seir was named for Seir the Horite, whose offspring, the Horites, had previously inhabited the area (Genesis 14:6, 36:20). Chedorlaomer, king of Elam, and his allies "defeated ... the Horites in their hill country of Seir, as far as El-paran on the border of the wilderness", before they embarked on the Battle of Siddim.

Mount Seir is noted as the place where Esau made his home, apparently because in Canaan the land could not sustain his growing family and that of his brother Jacob. Later, having left Paddan Aram in Upper Mesopotamia, Jacob sent messengers to Seir to advise of his impending arrival, and following their reconciliation meeting, Esau offered to let Jacob and his family join him there. Jacob tells Esau that he will follow him to Seir, but in fact chooses instead to travel to Succoth and then to Shechem.

The children of Esau, the Edomites, battled against the Horites and destroyed them (Deuteronomy 2:4–5, 12, 22).

In the Book of Numbers, the prophet Balaam, predicting Israelite victories over the Trans-Jordanian nations at the end of their Exodus from Egypt, stated "Edom shall be a possession; Seir also, his enemies, shall be a possession".

In the Song of Deborah in the Book of Judges, God is described as emerging from Seir to lead the Israelites in battle.

Mount Seir is also given as the location where the remnants "of the Amalekites that had escaped" were annihilated by five hundred Simeonites (1 Chronicles 4:42–43). In 2 Chronicles 20:22–23, the "inhabitants of Mt. Seir", i.e. the Edomites, came along with the Ammonites and Moabites against Jehoshaphat of Judah, however "the LORD set ambushments" against them, causing their forces to annihilate one another. Mount Seir is also referenced in the prophetic books as a term for Edom, as in Isaiah 21:11 and Ezekiel 25:8 and 35:10.

=== Northern Mount Seir ===
There is also another Seir mountain near Hebron which, according to Joshua 15:10, was allotted to the tribe of Judah, near the modern town of Sa'ir in the West Bank.

== Egyptian sources ==
Before the emergence of the kingdoms of Israel and Judah and Edom, with Mount Seir standing on the Edomite side of the border, this range marked the southeastern border of Egyptian Canaan during the Late Bronze Age. This is suggested by the description of the military campaign undertaken in Canaan by Ramses III (r. 1186–1155 BCE), and possibly also by the Amarna letter EA 288, if "the land of Šeru" is to be understood to mean Seir.

== See also ==
- Al-Sharat, region in Jordan and Saudi Arabia containing Jibāl ash-Sharāh
