= Aholibamah =

Human biblical figure (Genesis 36)

Aholibamah (Biblical Hebrew: אָהֳלִיבָמָה, romanized: ʾĀhŏliḇāmā, lit. 'Tent of the high place', also Oholibamah) is an eight-time referenced matriarch in the biblical record.

== Biblical narrative ==
Aholibamah was the daughter of Anah and granddaughter of Zibeon the Hivite, son of Seir the Horite. She was one of two Canaanite women who married Esau, the son of Isaac, when he was in his forties. Isaac and his wife Rebecca, however, were greatly opposed to this union. According to some Biblical scholars, Esau changed her name to Judith to pacify his parents. See Wives of Esau. Biblical scholars thus reconciled the two different name accounts given in Genesis for the three wives of Esau:

- Basemath (Genesis 26:34–35) = Adah (Genesis 36:2,3), the daughter of Elon the Hittite;
- Judith (Genesis 26:34–35) = Aholibamah (Genesis 36:2,3), also a Canaanite;
- Mahalath (Genesis 28:9) = Bashemath (Genesis 36:2,3), Esau's cousin and third wife, daughter of Ishmael.

The name Aholibamah appears again later among the listed clans of Edom, suggesting that a descendant of Esau had the same (female) name and became a chief.

== Legacy ==
Easton's Bible Dictionary says that "a district among the mountains of Edom, probably near Mount Hor, was called after her name, or it may be that she received her name from the district".
