= Nebaioth =

Firstborn son of Ishmael in the Hebrew Bible

Nebaioth (Hebrew: נְבָיוֹת Nəḇāyōṯ; Arabic: نابت, romanized: Nābit) or Nebajoth is mentioned at least five times in the Hebrew Bible, according to which he was the firstborn son of Ishmael, and the name appears as the name of one of the wilderness tribes mentioned in the Book of Genesis 25:13, and in the Book of Isaiah 60:7.

The biblical Nabaioth have been identified with the place of Nebaya (or the Nabaiātes) mentioned in Assyrian sources and Taymanitic inscriptions.

== Biblical occurrences ==
In the Book of Genesis, Nebaioth is listed as the firstborn son of Ishmael:

...Now these are the generations of Ishmael, Abraham's son, whom Hagar the Egyptian, Sarah's handmaid, bore unto Abraham. And these are the names of the sons of Ishmael, by their names, according to their generations: the first-born of Ishmael, Nebaioth; and Kedar, and Adbeel, and Mibsam, and Mishma, and Dumah, and Massa; Hadad, and Tema, Jetur, Naphish, and Kedem; these are the sons of Ishmael, and these are their names, by their villages, and by their encampments; twelve princes according to their nations... (Genesis 25:12-16)

Nebaioth is portrayed as the brother of Mahalath, one of Esau's wives:

(1): ...and Esau saw that the daughters of Canaan pleased not Isaac his father; so Esau went unto Ishmael, and took unto the wives that he had Mahalath the daughter of Ishmael, Abraham's son, the sister of Nebaioth, to be his wife... (Genesis 28:8-9)

(2): ...Esau took his wives of the daughters of Canaan; Adah the daughter of Elon the Hittite, and Oholibamah the daughter of Anah, the daughter of Zibeon the Hivite, and Basemath Ishmael's daughter, sister of Nebaioth... (Genesis 36:2-3)

Nebaioth is again mentioned as Ishmael's firstborn in the genealogies of the First Book of Chronicles:

...These are their generations: the first-born of Ishmael, Nebaioth; then Kedar, and Adbeel, and Mibsam, Mishma, and Dumah, Massa, Hadad, and Tema, Jetur, Naphish, and Kedem. These are the sons of Ishmael... (1 Chronicles 1:29-31)

In the Book of Isaiah, Nebaioth is mentioned along with his brother Kedar:

... All the flocks of Kedar shall be assembled for you, the rams of Nebaioth shall serve your needs; they shall be welcome offerings on My altar, and I will add glory to My glorious House... (Isaiah 60:7)

== Extra-biblical occurrences ==
Josephus, the Jewish historian of the Roman era, described the descendants of Ishmael as Arabs, linking them with the historical Nabataeans of Hellenistic and Roman times (Jewish Antiquities 1.12.4):

twelve sons in all were born to Ishmael, Nabaioth(es), Kedar, Abdeêl, Massam, Masma, Idum(as), Masmes, Chodam, Thaiman, Jetur, Naphais, Kadmas. These occupied the whole country extending from the Euphrates to the Red Sea and called it Nabatene. And it is these who conferred their names on the Arabian nation (to tōn Arabōn ethnos) and its tribes.

The identification of the Arabs as Ishmaelites has also been expressed by Apollonius Molon and Origen, and was later adopted by Eusebius and Jerome. Some modern historians reject any connection of the Nabataeans to the "tribe of Nebaioth". Classical Arab historians sometimes name Nebaioth as an ancestor of Muhammad. However the majority of traditions point to Kedar, another son of Ishmael, as his ancestor.

Offspring of Ishmael (Book of Jasher)
Sons of Nebaioth, the first born of Ishmael	Mend	Send	Mayon
Sons of Kedar	Alyon	Kezem	Chamad	Eli
Sons of Adbeel	Chamad	Jabin
Sons of Mibsam	Obadiah	Ebedmelech	Yeush
Sons of Mishma	Shamua	Zecaryon	Obed
Sons of Dumah	Kezed	Eli	Machmad	Amed
Sons of Masa	Melon	Mula	Ebidadon
Sons of Chadad	Azur	Minzar	Ebedmelech
Sons of Tema	Seir	Sadon	Yakol
Sons of Yetur	Merith	Yaish	Alyo	Pachoth
Sons of Naphish	Ebed-Tamed	Abiyasaph	Mir
Sons of Kedma	Calip	Tachti	Omir

== Works cited ==
- Tebes, Juan Manual (2023). "The Southern Levant and Northern Arabia in the Iron Age". In Radner, Karen; Moeller, Nadine; Potts, D. T. (eds.). The Oxford History of the Ancient Near East: The Age of Persia. Vol. 5. Oxford University Press. pp. 231–298. ISBN 978-0-19-068766-3.
