= Rebecca (biblical figure) =

Biblical character

- רִבְקָה
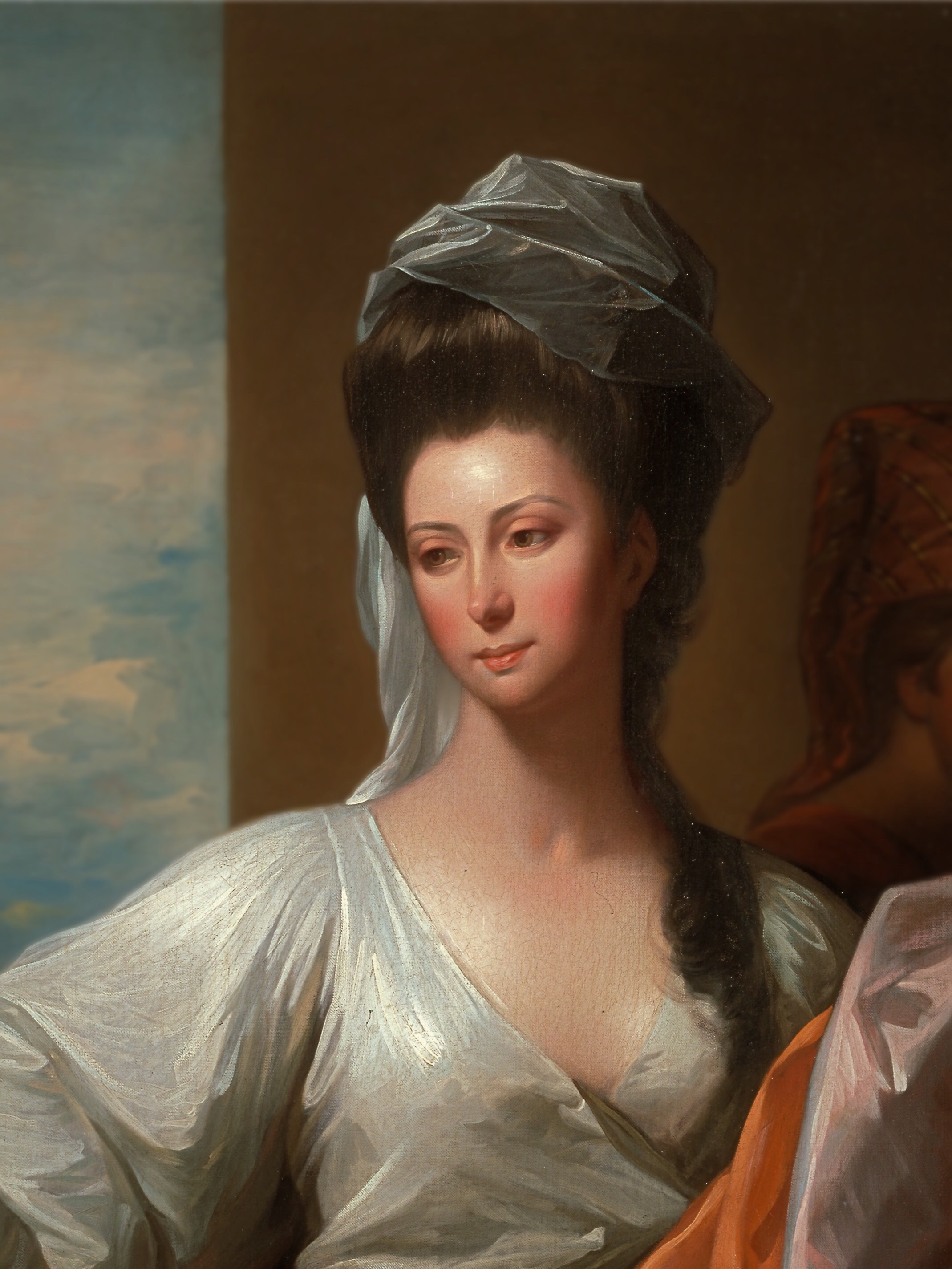
- Abram's servant tying the bracelet on Rebecca's arm (1775) by Benjamin West
- Born: Paddan Aram, Aram-Naharaim (present-day Harran, Turkey)
- Died: Unknown
- Spouse: Isaac
- Children: Esau (son); Jacob (son)
- Father: Bethuel
- Relatives: Laban (brother); Nahor II (grandfather); Milcah (grandmother)

Rebecca or Rebekah (Note: Hebrew: רִבְקָה, Modern: Rīvqa, Tiberian: Rīḇqā ISO 259-3 Ribqah, Ancient Greek: Ῥεβέκκα, Rhebékka; Syriac: ܪܲܦܩܵܐ, Rapqa) from the Hebrew ribhqeh (lit. 'connection'), from Semitic root r-b-q, 'to tie, couple or join', 'to secure', or 'to snare')) (/rɪˈbɛkə/) appears in the Hebrew Bible as the wife of Isaac and the mother of Jacob and Esau. According to biblical tradition, Rebecca's father was Bethuel the Aramean from Paddan Aram, also called Aram-Naharaim. Rebecca's brother was Laban the Aramean, and she was the granddaughter of Milcah and Nahor, the brother of Abraham. Rebecca and Isaac were one of the four couples that some believe are buried in the Cave of the Patriarchs, the other three being Adam and Eve, Abraham and Sarah, and Jacob and Leah. Most scholars have considered Rebecca's historicity uncertain.

== Early life ==
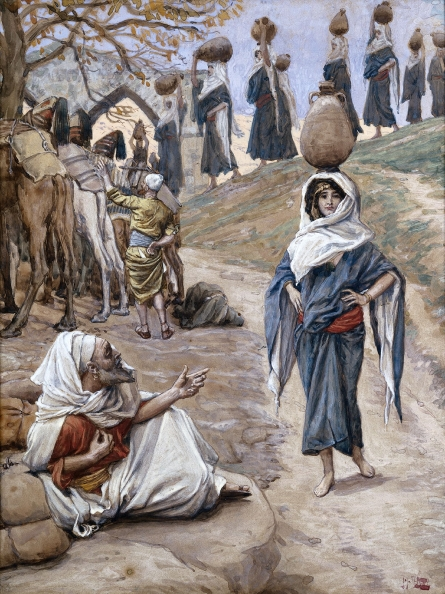
Abram's Servant Meeteth Rebecca (1896–1902) by James Tissot

Rabbinic tradition states that Rebecca was born concurrent to the Binding of Isaac. After Sarah died, Abraham went about finding a wife for his son Isaac. He commanded his servant (whom the Torah commentators identify as Eliezer of Damascus) to journey to Aram Naharaim in Mesopotamia to select a bride from his own family, rather than engage Isaac to a local Canaanite girl. Abraham sent along expensive jewelry, clothing and dainties as gifts to the bride and her family. If the girl had refused to follow him, Abraham stated that the servant would be absolved of his responsibility, and on no account was he to take Isaac back to Mesopotamia.

The servant devised a test in order to find the right wife for Isaac. As he stood at the well outside the city of Nahor, with his men and ten camels laden with goods, he prayed to God:

Let the maiden to whom I say, 'Please, lower your jar that I may drink,' and who replies, 'Drink, and I will also water your camels'—let her be the one whom You have decreed for Your servant Isaac. Thereby shall I know that You have dealt graciously with my master.

— Genesis 24:14

Immediately, and even before he had finished praying, a young girl suddenly came to the well, (Note: Joseph Benson notes from Genesis 24:61 that Rebecca had attendants of her own, so she did not come to the well out of obligation, but from choice.) and offered to draw water for him to drink, as well as water to fill a trough for all his camels. (Note: "Troughs" (plural) in the Vulgate translation.) Rebecca continued to draw water until all the camels were sated, proving her kind and generous nature and her suitability for entering Abraham's household.

The servant immediately gave her a golden necklace (Septuagint translation) or nose ring (Masoretic translation) and two golden bracelets,, which Rebecca hurried to show her mother. Seeing the jewelry, Rebecca's brother Laban ran out to greet the guest and bring him inside. The servant recounted the oath he made to Abraham and all the details of his trip to and meeting with Rebecca in fine detail, after which her brother Laban and her father Bethuel agreed that she could return with him. After hosting the party overnight, the family tried to keep Rebecca with them longer. The servant insisted that they ask the girl herself, and she agreed to go immediately. Her family sent her off with her nurse, Deborah (according to Rashi), and blessed her as she left: "May you, our sister, become thousands of myriads; may your offspring gain possession of the gates of their foes". Abraham had also, previously, been promised that his offspring would "possess the gate of their enemies".

As Rebecca and her entourage approached Abraham's home, they spied Isaac from a distance in the fields of Beer-lahai-roi. The Talmud and the Midrash explain that Isaac was praying, as he instituted Mincha, the afternoon prayer. Seeing such a spiritually exalted man, Rebecca immediately dismounted from her camel and asked the accompanying servant who he was. When she heard that this was her future husband, she modestly covered herself with a veil. Isaac brought her into the tent of his deceased mother Sarah, married her, and loved her.

According to Rashi, the three miracles that characterized Sarah's tent while she was alive, and that disappeared with her death, reappeared when Rebecca entered the tent. These were: A lamp burned in her tent from Shabbat eve to Shabbat eve, there was a blessing in her dough, and a cloud hovered over her tent (symbolizing the Divine Presence).

== Marriage and motherhood ==
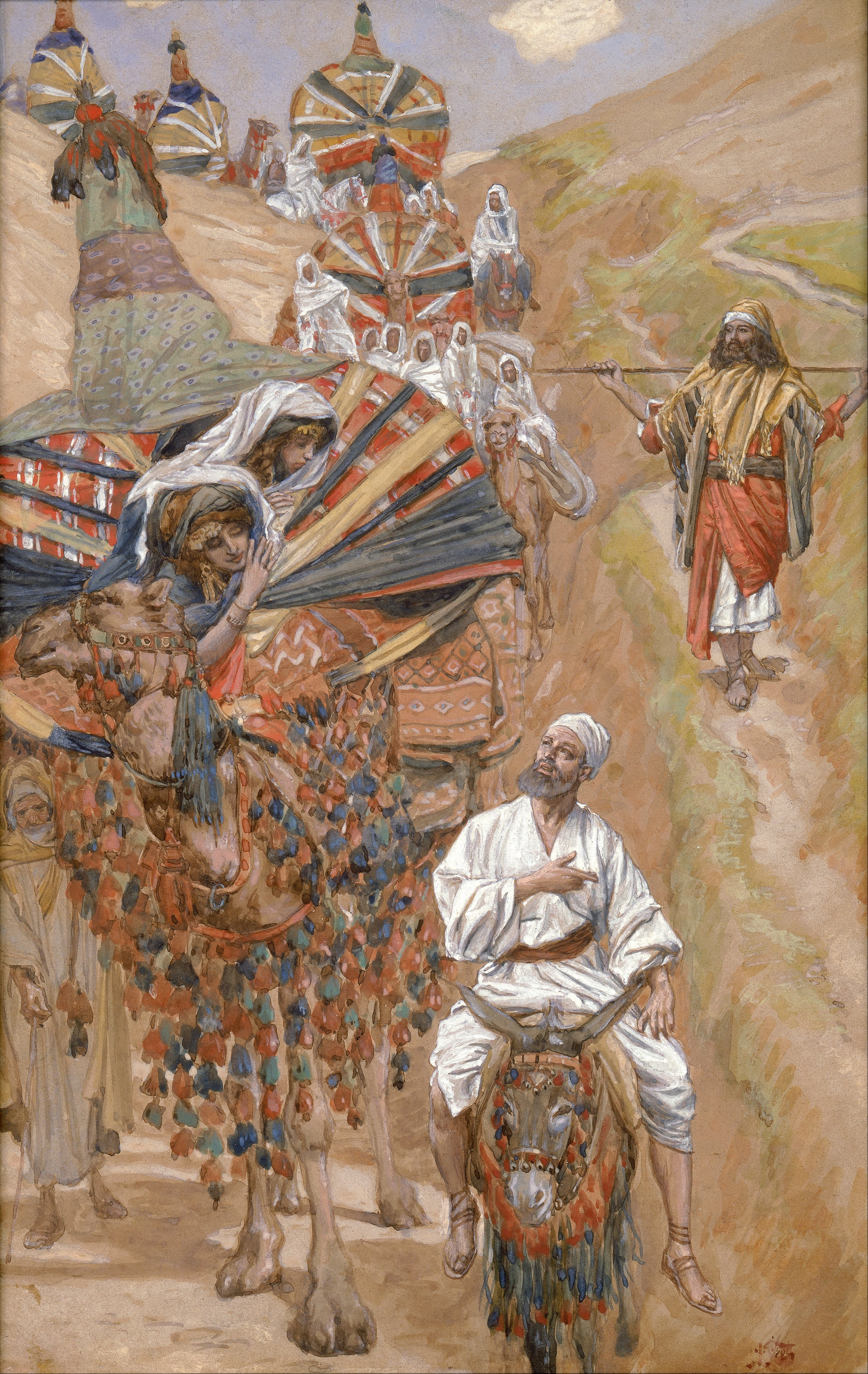
Rebecca Meets Isaac by the Way, by James Tissot (c. 1896–1902)

According to the traditional counting cited by Rashi, Isaac was 37 years old at the time of the Binding of Isaac. The reasoning for that age is that Sarah, who gave birth to Isaac when she was 90, died after the binding when she was 127 years old, making Isaac around 37 at that time. The Biblical text is silent on Rebecca's age at marriage, while the Book of Jubilees (written before 100 BCE) determines her age at 20 years. Later rabbinical commentators have disagreed on her age; some (Targum Pseudo-Jonathan, dated by most scholars after the Islamic Conquests) interpreted Rebecca's age at 3 at the time of her marriage based on the idea that she was born when Abraham ascended Mount Moriah, but other rabbis concluded that she was 14 years old (11 years before the ascension); both numbers are present in the Seder Olam Rabbah (edited after 160 CE). Twenty years elapsed before they had children; Rebecca was said to be barren, and throughout that time, both Isaac and Rebecca prayed fervently to God for offspring. God eventually answered Isaac's prayers and Rebecca conceived.

Rebecca was extremely uncomfortable during her pregnancy as her unborn twins struggled with each other, and she went to inquire of God why she was suffering so. H. E. Ryle suggests that she may have traveled to a sacred place associated with divine revelation such as Beersheba. According to the Midrash, whenever she would pass a house of Torah study, Jacob would struggle to come out; whenever she would pass a house of idolatry, Esau would agitate to come out. Thinking that she was carrying one baby who was displaying conflicting propensities, Rebecca sought enlightenment at the yeshiva of Shem and Eber. There she received the prophecy that twins were fighting in her womb and would continue to fight all their lives. The prophecy also said that the older would serve the younger; its statement, "One people will be stronger than the other" has been taken to mean that the two nations will never gain power simultaneously; when one falls, the other will rise, and vice versa. According to tradition, Rebecca did not share the prophecy with her husband.

When the time came for Rebecca to give birth, the first child to come out emerged red and hairy all over, with his heel grasped by the hand of the second to come out. Onlookers named the first עשו, Esau ('Esav or 'Esaw, meaning either "rough", "sensibly felt", "handled", from Hebrew: עשה, 'asah, "do" or "make"; or "completely developed", from Hebrew: עשוי, 'assui, since Esau had as much hair as a child who was much older). The second was named יעקב, Jacob (Ya'aqob or Ya'aqov, meaning "heel-catcher", "supplanter", "leg-puller", "he who follows upon the heels of one", from Hebrew: עקב, 'aqab or 'aqav, "seize by the heel", "circumvent", "restrain", a wordplay upon Hebrew: עקבה, 'iqqebah or 'iqqbah, "heel"). The Bible states that Isaac was sixty years old when the twins were born.

The Midrash says that as boys, people did not notice much difference between them. When they reached the age of 13, Jacob busied himself in the house of study, while Esau busied himself with idolatry. The descriptions of the two young men hint at their opposing spiritual natures: "The lads grew up and Esau became one who knows hunting, a man of the field; but Jacob was a wholesome man, abiding in tents". The description of Esau as a "hunter" hints to his skill of trapping his father with his mouth; for example, he would ask Isaac whether tithes should be taken from salt and straw, making his father think he was scrupulous in keeping the mitzvot. Scripture notes that the attitudes of their parents toward the boys differed: "Isaac loved Esau because he did eat of hunting, but Rebecca loved Jacob".

According to the Talmud, immediately after Abraham died, Jacob prepared a lentil stew as a traditional mourner's meal for his father, Isaac. The Hebrew Bible states that Esau, returning famished from the fields, begged Jacob to give him some of the stew. (Esau referred to the dish as "that red, red stuff", giving rise to his nickname, Hebrew: אדום ('Edom, meaning "Red")). Jacob offered to give Esau a bowl of stew in exchange for his birthright (the right to be recognized as firstborn), and Esau agreed. The Talmudic dating indicates both men were 15 years old at the time. (Note: This is understood from the plain meaning of the verses. Abraham was one hundred years when Isaac was born (Genesis 46:5). Isaac was sixty years old when the twins were born (Genesis 25:26). Abraham died at the age of 175 (Genesis 25:7), making Jacob and Esau fifteen years old at the time of Abraham's death.)

At a later time, a famine struck the land of Israel and Isaac moved his family, upon God's command, to Gerar, which was ruled by Abimelech, king of the Philistines. Like Abraham before him, who called Sarah his "sister" rather than his "wife" so that the Egyptians would not kill him and take his wife, Isaac told the people of Gerar that Rebecca was his sister. She was not molested, but one day Abimelech looked through the window and saw Isaac "sporting" (a euphemism for sexual play) with her. Abimelech called Isaac on his lie, and then warned others not to touch Rebecca. Eventually Isaac parted from Abimelech in peace.

At the age of 40 (the same age his father had been when he married), Esau took two Hittite wives, Judith the daughter of Beeri, and Basemath the daughter of Elon, who vexed Isaac and Rebecca to no end, as these women were also idol-worshippers. One reason why Isaac became blind in his old age was due to the smoke of the incense that these women offered to their idols.

== Deception of Isaac ==
Isaac became blind in his old age and decided to bestow the blessing of the firstborn upon Esau. According to the Midrash, Isaac had reached the age of 132, five years past the age of his mother, Sarah, had been at the time of her death. According to Genesis, Isaac had reached the age of 137. At this time, the Sages state that one should begin to think he might not exceed the age of whichever parent died first. Isaac therefore sent Esau out to the fields to trap and cook a piece of game for him, so that he could eat it and bless Esau before he died.

Rebecca overheard this conversation and realized that Isaac's blessings should go to Jacob, since she was told before the twins' birth that the older son would serve the younger. She therefore ordered Jacob to bring her two goats from the flock, which she cooked in the way Isaac loved, and had him bring them to his father in place of Esau.

When Jacob protested that his father would recognize the deception and curse him as soon as he felt him, since Esau was hairy and Jacob smooth-skinned, Rebecca said that the curse would be on her instead. Before she sent Jacob to his father, she dressed him in Esau's garments and laid goatskins on his arms and neck to simulate hairy skin.

Thus disguised, Jacob entered his father's room. Surprised to perceive that Esau was back so soon, Isaac asked how it could be that the hunt went so quickly. Jacob responded, "Because the LORD your God arranged it for me"; Rashi (on Genesis 52:46) says that Isaac's suspicions were aroused because Esau never used the personal name of God. Isaac demanded that Jacob come close so he could feel him, but the goatskins felt just like Esau's hairy skin. Confused, Isaac exclaimed, "The voice is the voice of Jacob, but the hands are the hands of Esau!" (27:22). Still trying to get at the truth, Isaac asked him point-blank, "Are you really my son Esau?" and Jacob answered simply, "I am" (which can be taken as "I am me", not "I am Esau"). Isaac proceeded to eat the food and to drink the wine that Jacob gave him, and then he blessed him with the dew of the heavens, the fatness of the earth, and rulership over many nations as well as his own brother.

Jacob had scarcely left the room when Esau returned from the hunt to receive the blessing. The realization that he has been deceived shocks Isaac, yet he acknowledged that Jacob received the blessings as sworn, by adding, "Indeed, he will be [or remain] blessed!" (52:8). Rashi explains that Isaac smelled the heavenly scent of Gan Eden (Paradise) when Jacob entered his room. As a contrast, Isaac perceived Gehenna opening beneath Esau when the latter entered the room, showing Isaac that he had been deceived all along by Esau's show of piety.

Esau was heartbroken by the deception, and begged for his own blessing. Having made Jacob a ruler over his brothers, Isaac could only promise, "By thy sword thou shalt live, and shalt serve thy brother; yet it shall come to pass when thou shalt have the dominion, that thou shalt cast off his yoke from off thy neck" (Genesis 27:40).

Esau was filled with hatred toward Jacob for taking away both his birthright and his blessing. He vowed to himself to kill Jacob as soon as Isaac died. Here again, Rebecca prophetically perceived his murderous intentions and ordered Jacob to travel to her brother Laban's house in Haran, until Esau's anger subsided. She then convinced Isaac to send Jacob away, by telling him that she despaired of him marrying a local girl from the idol-worshipping families of Canaan (as Esau had done). After Isaac sent Jacob away (to find a wife), Esau realized that his own Canaanite wives were evil in his father's eyes. Esau therefore took Mahalath, a daughter of Isaac's half-brother Ishmael, as another wife.

== Death and burial ==
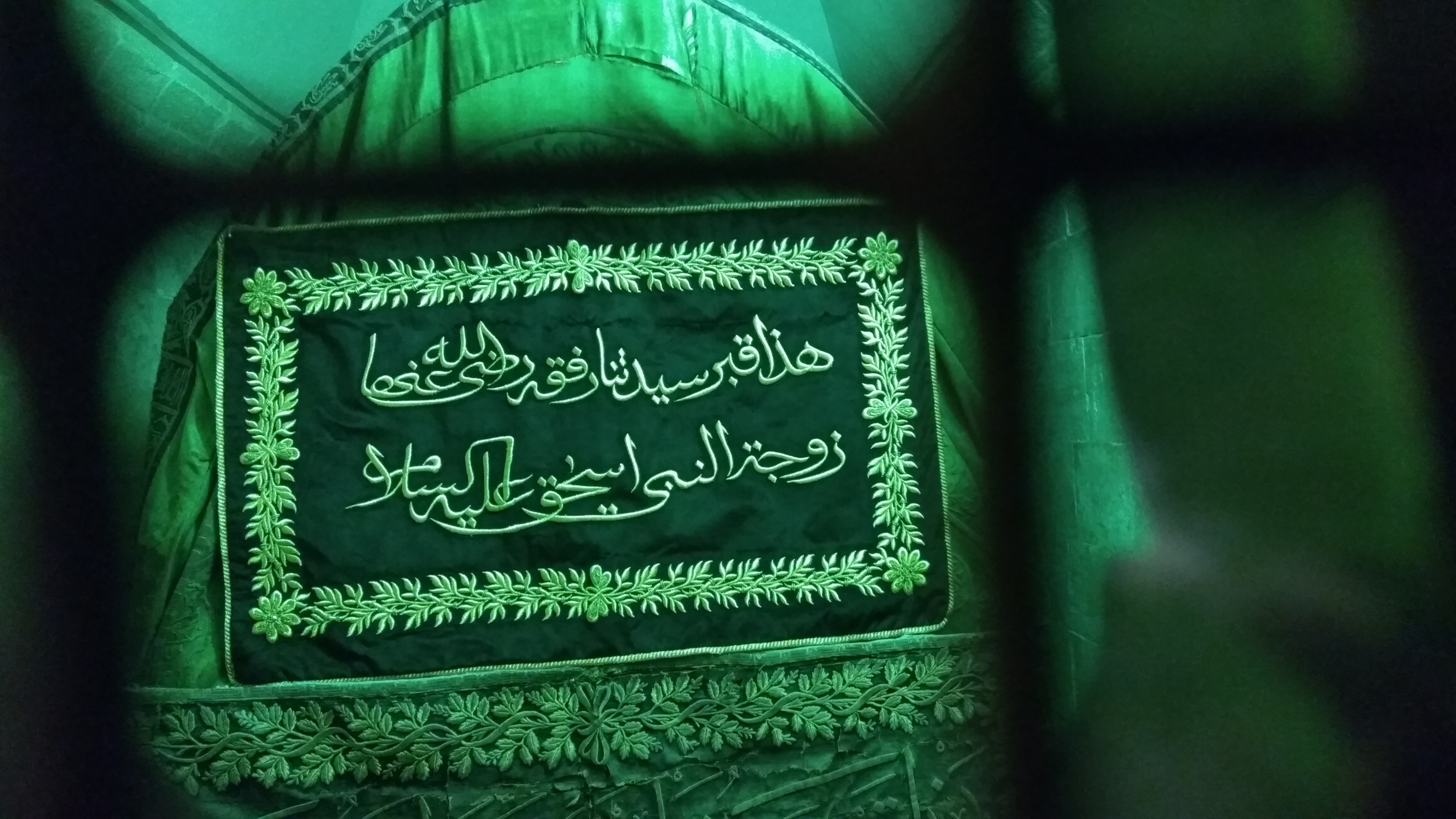
Grave of Rebecca in Hebron

Jacob lived with Laban for twenty years (Gen. 31:41), marrying Laban's two daughters and two maidservants. He returned to Canaan with his large family, servants, and possessions. As he did, Deborah (Rebecca's nurse) died and was buried at a place that Jacob calls Alon Bachuth (אלון בכות), "Tree of Weepings" (Gen. 35:8). According to the Midrash, the plural form of the word "weeping" indicates a double sorrow, implying that Rebecca also died at this time.

Rebecca was buried in the Cave of Machpelah near Mamre, in the land of Canaan (Gen. 49:31).

According to the Talmud, the Torah's explicit dating of the life of Ishmael helps to date various events in Jacob's life and, by implication, the age of Rebecca at her death. Ishmael was born when Abraham was 86 years old (Genesis 16:16) and died at the age of 137 (Genesis 25:17). Isaac was born when Abraham was 100 (Genesis 21:5); at that time Ishmael was 14. Jacob and Esau were born when Isaac was 60 (Genesis 25:26); at that time Ishmael was 74. Right after Jacob receives the blessings and flees to Laban, the Torah states that Esau married "Mahalat, the daughter of Ishmael, son of Abraham, sister of Nebaiot" (Genesis 28:9), on which Rashi, quoting Megillah 17a, notes that Ishmael died between the engagement and wedding, so the girl's brother gave her away. If Ishmael was 137 at the time of his death, this means that Jacob and Esau were 63 at the time of the blessings. The Talmud adds that Jacob spent 14 years in the yeshiva of Shem and Eber before proceeding to Laban, arriving when he was 77. Rebecca's death after Jacob's 20 years with Laban indicates that Jacob was 97 when his mother died and Rebecca was either 120 or 134 (based on different Midrashim mentioned earlier about her age at marriage).

== Legacy ==
Some of the events leading up to the marriage of Isaac and Rebecca have been institutionalized in the traditional Jewish wedding ceremony. Before the bride and bridegroom stand under the chuppah, they take part in a special ceremony called badeken (veiling). The bridegroom is led to the bride by two escorts and, seeing her, covers her face with a veil, like the way Rebecca covered her face before marrying Isaac. Then the bridegroom (or the father of the bride, or the officiating rabbi) recites the same blessing over the bride that Rebecca's family recited over her, "Our sister, may you be the mother of thousands of ten thousands".

== Gallery ==
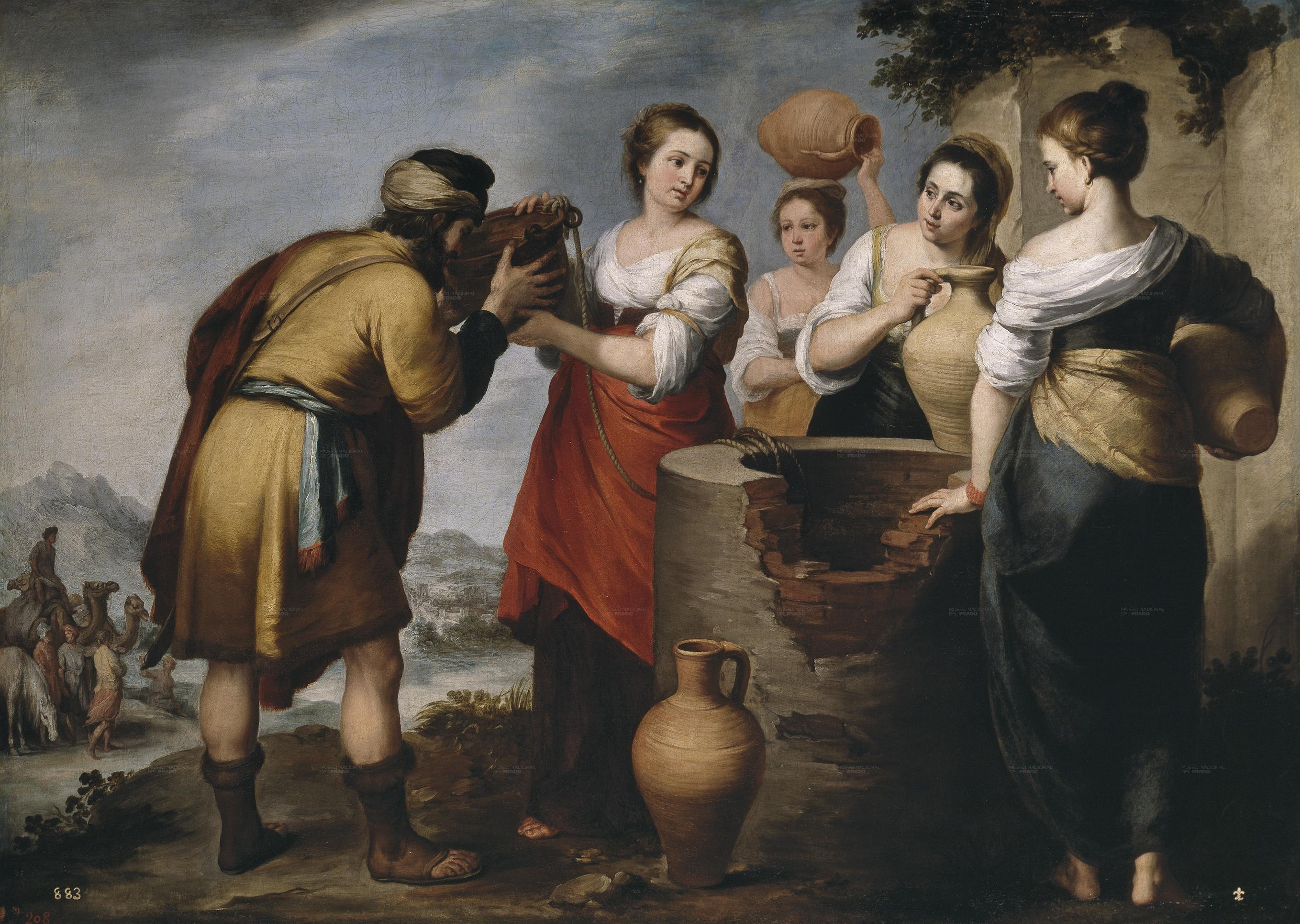
Rebecca and Eliezer (17th century) by Bartolomé Esteban Murillo

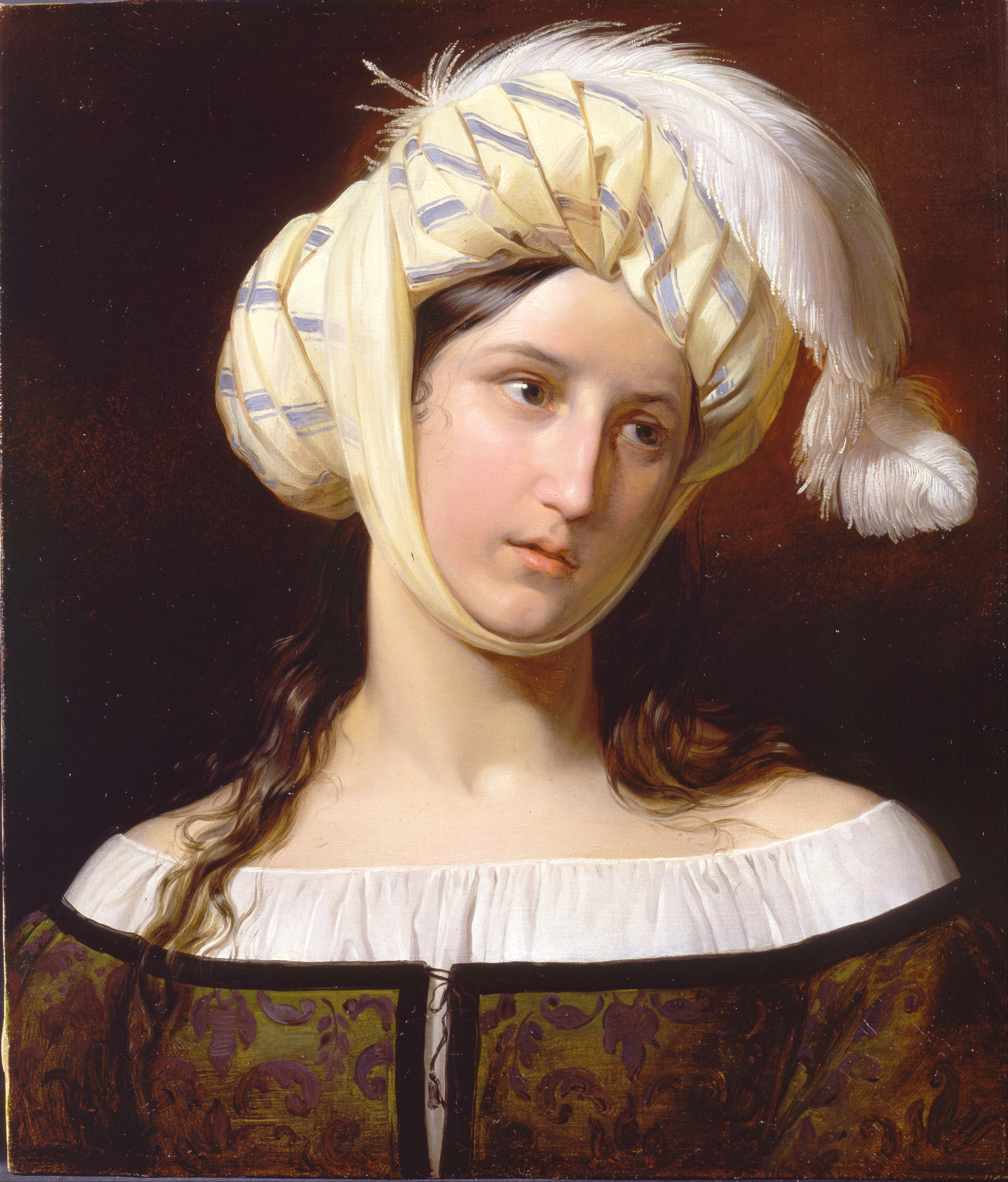
Rebecca by Giuseppe Molteni

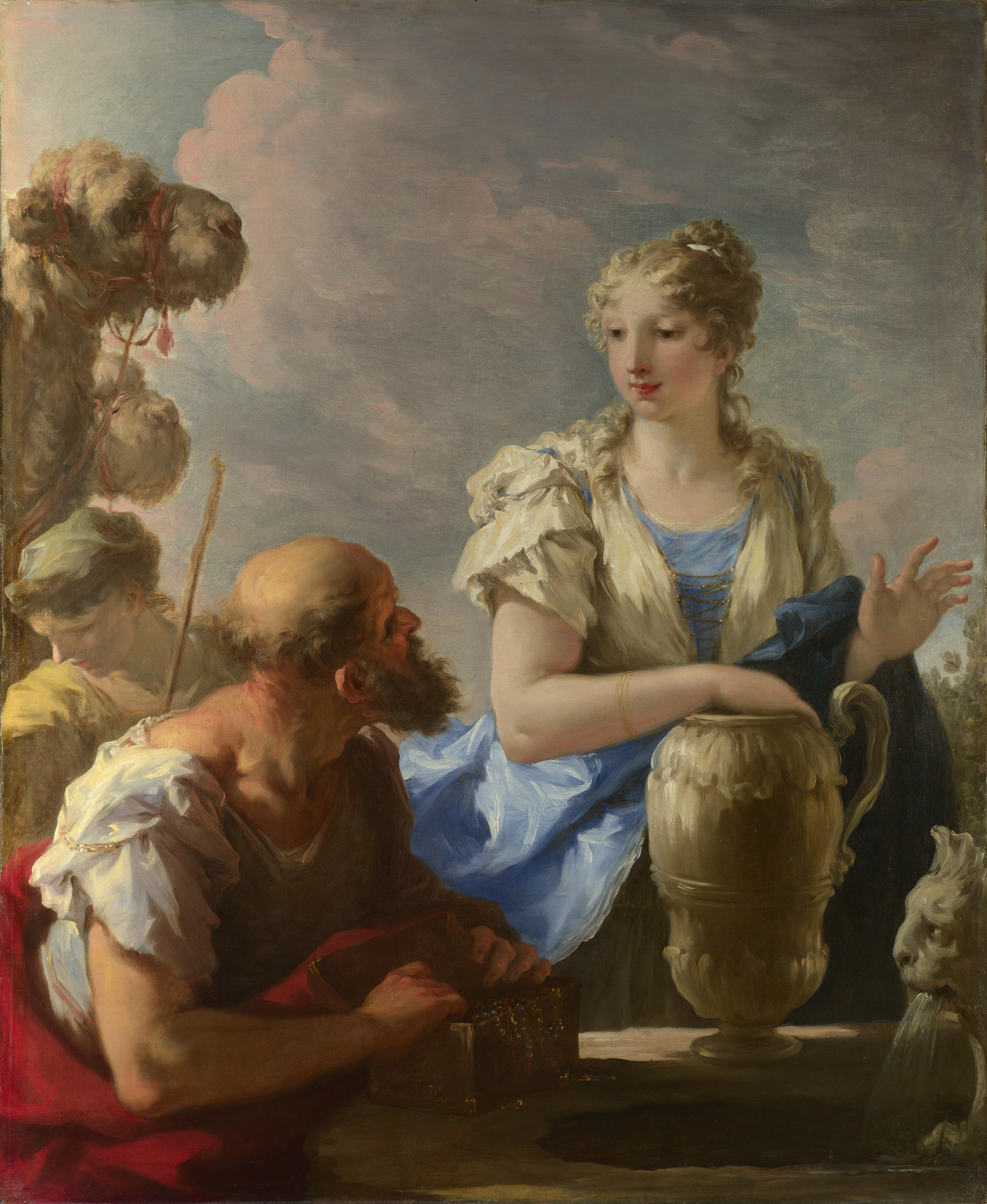
Rebecca at the Well by Giovanni Antonio Pellegrini

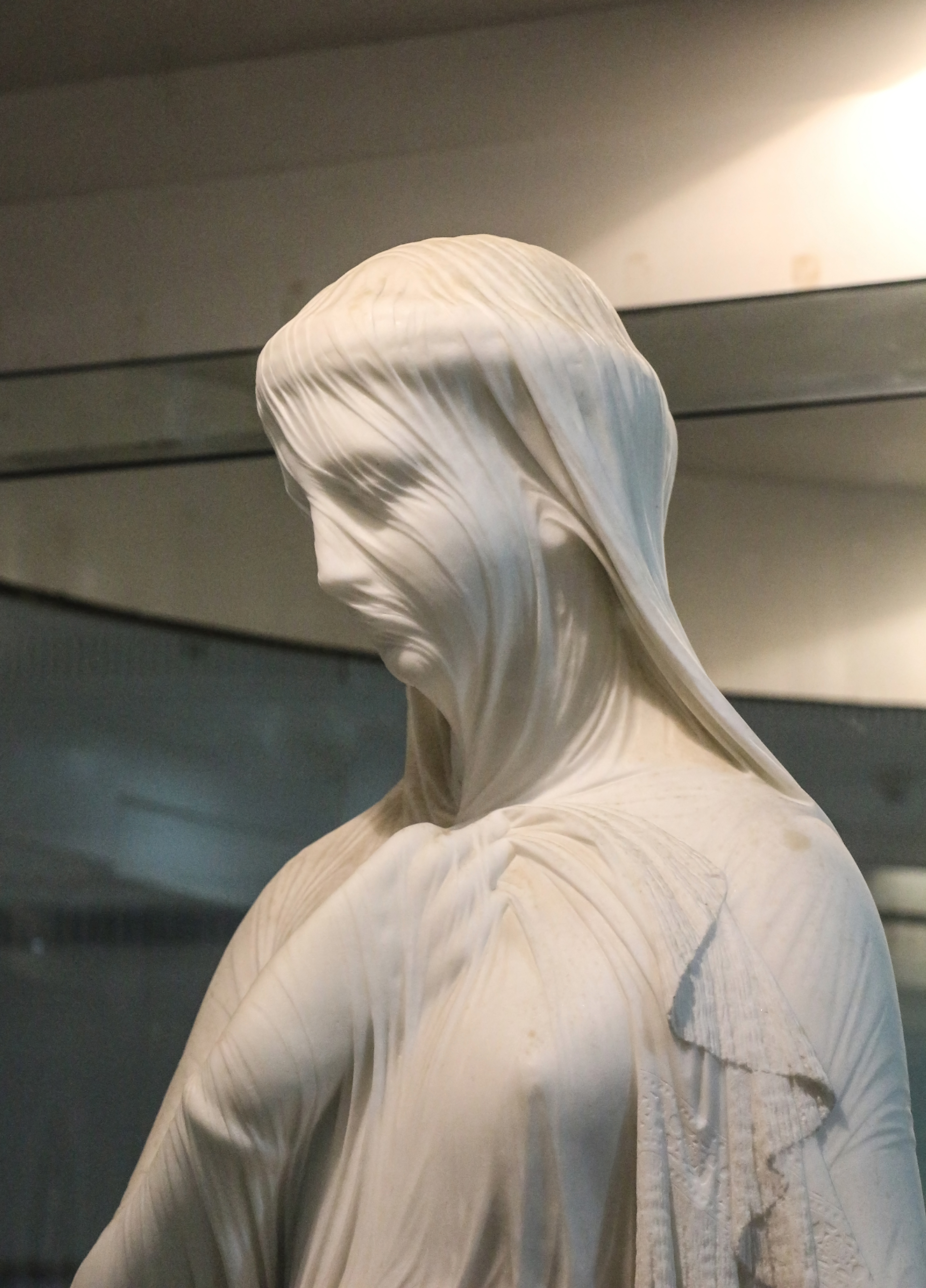
The Veiled Rebecca (1863) by Giovanni Maria Benzoni

== See also ==
- Rebekah (Women of Genesis series)

== Bibliography ==
- Boccacini, Gabriele (1998). Beyond the Essene Hypothesis. Eerdmans.
- Strack, H.L. (1991), Stemberger, Günter; Bockmuehl, Markus (eds.), Introduction to the Talmud and Midrash (Google eBook) (1996 ed.), Fortress Press, p. 326, ISBN 978-1451409147 (Note: page 326 in this edition was p. 354 in 1991).
- VanderKam, James C. (2001). The Book of Jubilees. Guides to Apocrypha and Pseudepigrapha. Vol. 9. Sheffield: Sheffield Academic Press. ISBN 978-1-85075-767-2.
