= Horites =

People, mentioned in the Torah, who lived around Mount Seir

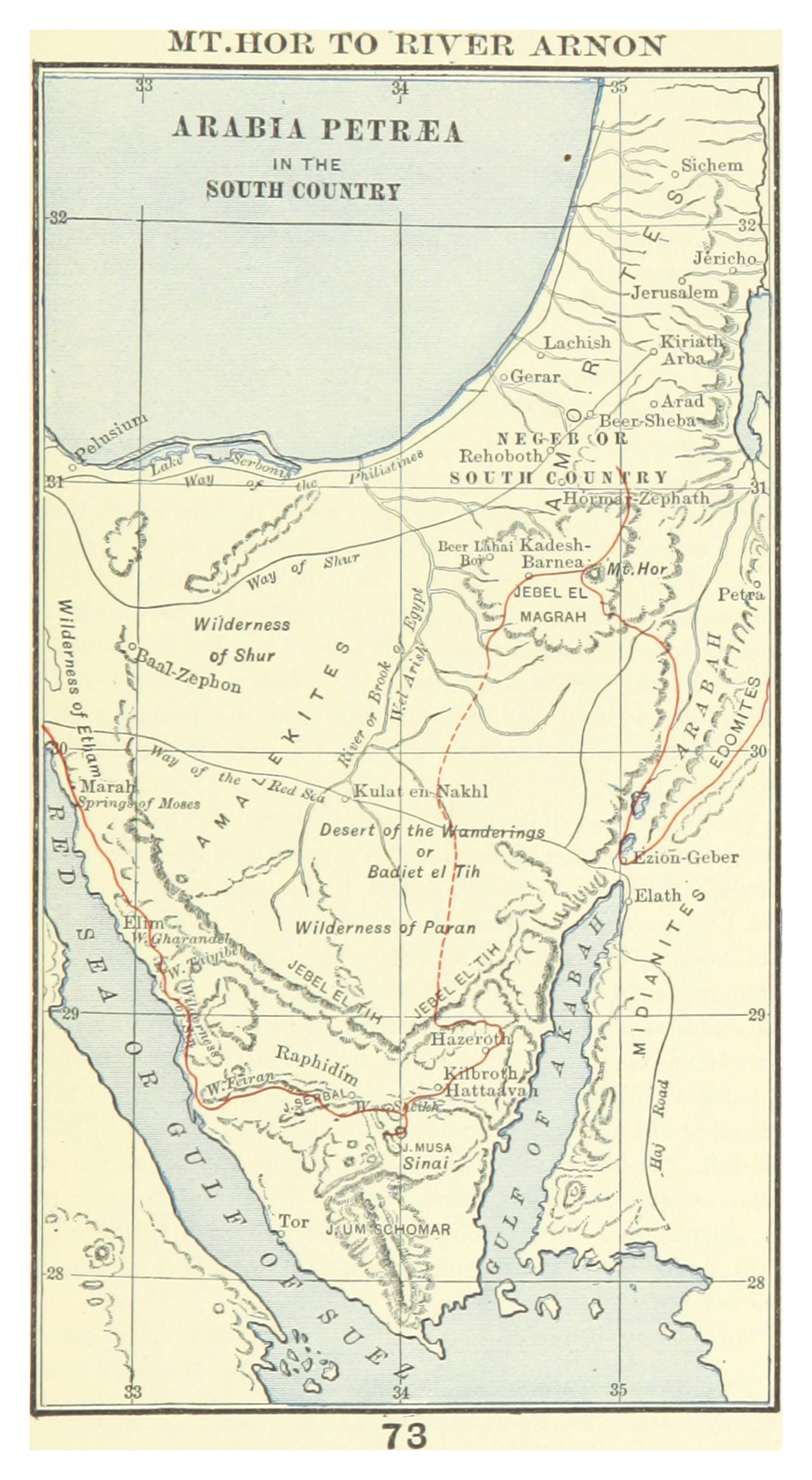
Map of Horites lands

The Horites (Hebrew: חֹרִים Ḥōrīm, "Chorraeos" in the Latin Vulgate), were a people mentioned in the Torah (Genesis 14:6, 36:20-30, Deuteronomy 2:12) inhabiting areas around Mount Seir in Canaan (Genesis 36:2,5). Genesis 36:20 also refers to Seir the Horite as an ancester of the Horites.

== Name ==
According to Archibald Sayce (1915), the Horites have been identified with references in Egyptian inscriptions to Khar (formerly translated as Harri), which concern a southern region of Canaan. More recent scholarship has associated them with the Hurrians.

The rabbinical tradition in Genesis Rabbah 42:6 (300-500 CE) says they are called Horites because "they made themselves independent [free]", (Note: The brackets are in the original text of the translation.) which assumes that the name is cognate with ḥori meaning "free".

== Hebrew Bible ==
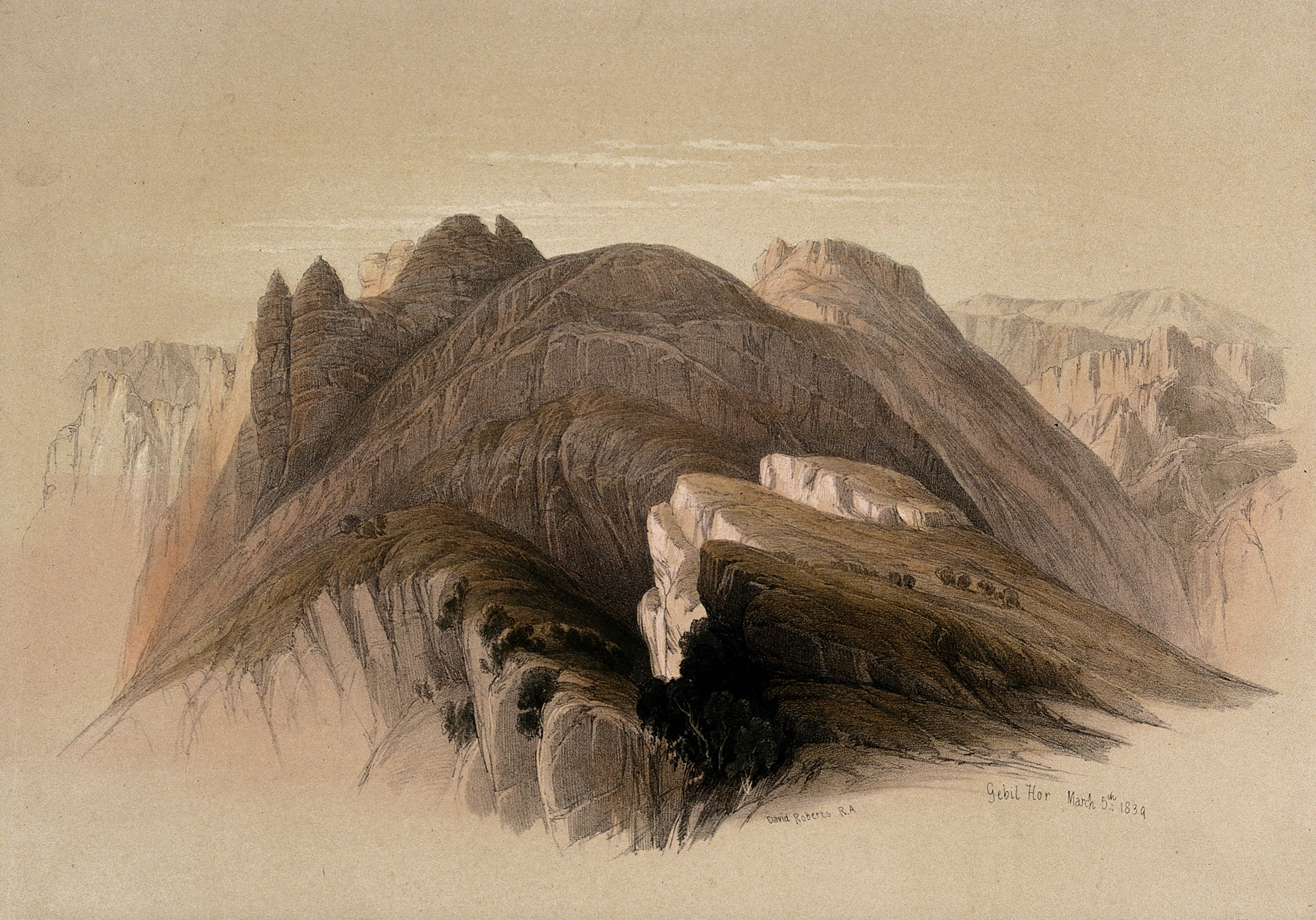
Mt Hor, seen from cliffs near Petra, from The Holy Land, Syria, Idumea, Arabia, Egypt, and Nubia

The Horites initially appear in the Torah as being members of a Canaanite coalition, who lived near Sodom and Gomorrah. The coalition rebelled against Chedorlaomer (or Kedorlaomer) of Elam, who had ruled them for twelve years. In response, Chedorlaomer attacked and subdued several nations, including the Horites.

Later, according to Genesis 36, the Horites co-existed and inter-married with the family of Esau, grandson of Abraham and son of Isaac. They were eventually brought under the rule of the descendants of Esau, also then known as Edom.

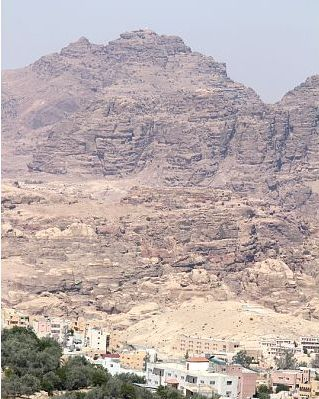
Mt Hor

The ancestry of Seir the Horite is not specified. Some say Seir lived around the time of Terah, father of Abraham. He is also said to be a descendant of Hor who is supposed to have lived around the time of Reu and was a descendant of Hivi, son of Canaan son of Ham.

The pre-Edomite Horite chiefs, descendants of Seir, are listed in the Book of Genesis (Genesis 36:20–29) and 1 Chronicles (1 Chronicles 1:38–42). Two of these chiefs would appear to have been female - Timna and Oholibamah. Timna is said to have been the progenitor of the Amalekites, the archenemy of the Israelites.

The chiefs who descended from Esau are listed in Genesis 36:40–43.

At some time, certain of these leaders rose to the level of 'kings' over the other chiefs, and the Horite land became known as Edom rather than the land of Seir. One example of these kings is Jobab, son of Zerah, a son of Esau and his wife Basemath, who was Ishmael's daughter (Genesis 36:35). Another is a 'Temanite', Husham (Genesis 36:34), a descendant of Esau's son, Teman (Genesis 36:10,11).

None of these kings' sons became kings after their fathers died. Apparently, there was no familial royal line whereby sons of these post-Horite kings succeeded to the throne, but rather, some other system was in place by which kings were either chosen or won the right to rule (Genesis 36:31–39).

By the time governance of these peoples had been consolidated under kings instead of chiefs, Horites are no longer mentioned as such. According to Deuteronomy 2:22, the Edomites destroyed the Horites and settled in their land.

== Commentary ==
Theologians Carl Friedrich Keil and Franz Delitzsch considered the Horites to be Rephaim, since Deuteronomy 2:22 explicitly compares the Edomite conquest with the Moabite and Ammonite conquests of the Rephaim. H. E. Ryle notes that they may have been "primitive cave dwellers".

From a theological perspective, it has been suggested that the biblical account of the Horites "serves as a backdrop to the unfolding narrative of God's providence and the fulfillment of His promises to the patriarchs. The displacement of the Horites by the Edomites is seen as part of the divine orchestration of history, where God allocates lands and establishes nations according to His purposes. The account of the Horites also underscores the transient nature of human settlements and the sovereignty of God over the affairs of nations. It reflects the biblical theme of God's control over history and His ability to raise up and depose peoples according to His divine plan."
