= Esau =

Older son of Isaac in the Hebrew Bible

- עֵשָׂו
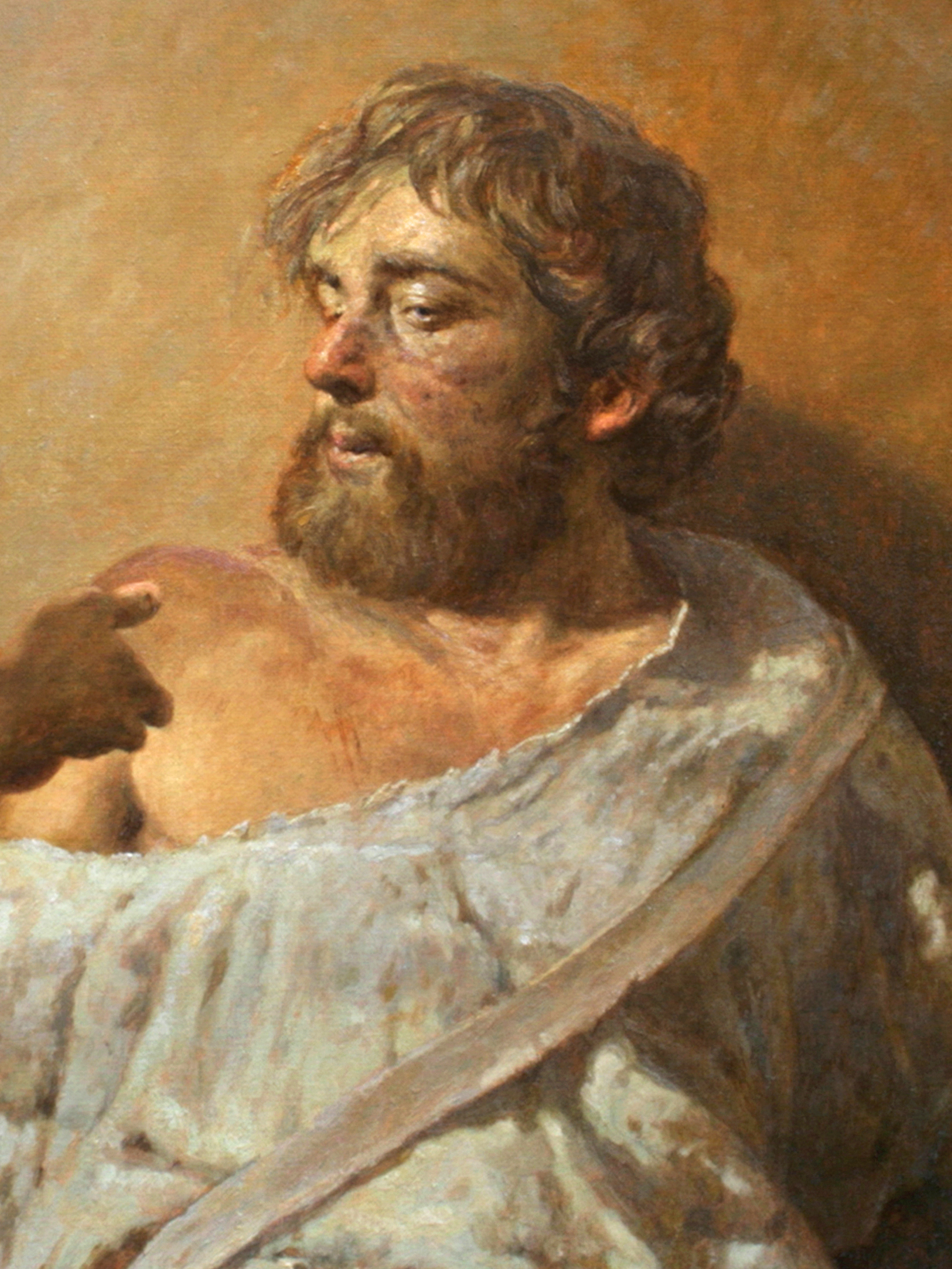
- Detail of Esau from Esau and Jacob (2014) by Andrei Mironov
- Born: Canaan
- Died: Canaan
- Spouses: Adah; Aholibamah; Basemath
- Children: Eliphaz; Reuel; Jeush; Jaalam; Korah
- Parents: Isaac (father); Rebecca (mother)
- Relatives: Jacob (twin brother); Amalek (grandchild)

Esau (Note: /ˈiːsɔː/; Hebrew: עֵשָׂו, Modern: ʿĒsáv, Tiberian: ʿĒśāw, ISO 259-3 ʕeśaw; Greek: Ἠσαῦ Ēsaû; Latin: Hesau, Esau; Arabic: عِيسَوْ ‘Īsaw; meaning "hairy" or "rough".) is the elder son of Isaac in the Hebrew Bible. He is mentioned in the Book of Genesis and by the prophets Obadiah and Malachi. The story of Jacob and Esau reflects the historical relationship between Israel and Edom, aiming to explain why Israel, despite being a younger kingdom, dominated Edom.

According to the Hebrew Bible, Esau is the progenitor of the Edomites and the elder brother of Jacob, the patriarch of the Israelites. Jacob and Esau were the sons of Isaac and Rebecca, and the grandsons of Abraham and Sarah. Of the twins, Esau was the first to be born with Jacob following, holding his heel. Isaac was sixty years old when the boys were born.

Esau, a "man of the field", became a hunter who had "rough" qualities that distinguished him from his twin brother. Among these qualities were his redness and noticeable hairiness. Jacob was a plain or simple man, depending on the translation of the Hebrew word tam (which also means "relatively perfect man"). Jacob's color was not mentioned. Throughout Genesis, Esau is frequently shown as being supplanted by his younger twin, Jacob (Israel).

The Christian New Testament alludes to him in the Epistle to the Romans and in the Epistle to the Hebrews.

According to the Muslim tradition, the prophet Yaqub, or Israel, was the favorite of his mother, and his twin brother Esau was the favorite of his father, prophet Ishaq, and he is mentioned in the "Story of Ya'qub" in Qisas al-Anbiya.

== Esau in the Hebrew Bible ==
=== In Genesis ===
The story of Esau and Jacob reflects the historical relationship between Israel and Edom, aiming to explain why Israel, despite being a younger kingdom, dominated Edom.

==== Birth ====
Genesis 25:21-23 reports that Rebecca for a long time was unable to conceive. Eventually she became pregnant with twins, who struggled with each other in her womb. Genesis 25:25 narrates Esau's birth: "Now the first came forth red, all over like a hairy garment; and they named him Esau." The meaning of the word esau itself is not entirely certain. Others have noted the similarity to Arabic: عثا, romanized: ʿaṯā, lit. 'hirsute'. The name Edom (Hebrew: אדום, romanized: ʾĔḏōm) is also attributed to Esau, meaning "red"; the same color is used to describe the color of his hair. Genesis parallels his redness to the "red lentil pottage" that he sold his birthright for. Esau became the progenitor of the Edomites in Mount Seir.

==== Birthright ====
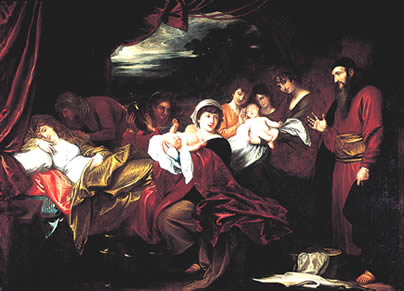
Esau and Jacob Presented to Isaac (painting circa 1779–1801 by Benjamin West)

In Genesis, Esau returned to his twin brother Jacob, famished from the fields. He begs Jacob to give him some "red pottage" (a play on his nickname, Edom.) This refers to his red hair. Jacob offers Esau a bowl of lentil stew (Hebrew: נְזִיד עֲדָשִׁ֔ים, romanized: nəziḏ ʿăḏāšim) in exchange for Esau's birthright (Hebrew: בְּכֹרָה, romanized: bəḵorā), the right to be recognized as firstborn son with authority over the family, and Esau agrees. Thus Jacob acquires Esau's birthright. This is the origin of the English phrase "to sell one's birthright for a mess of pottage".

In Genesis 27:1–40, Jacob deceives his blind father Isaac, motivated by his mother, Rebekah, to lay claim to the blessing that was inherently due to the firstborn, Esau. Rebekah overhears Isaac speaking to Esau. When Esau goes to the field to hunt for venison to bring home, Rebekah says to Jacob, "Behold, I heard thy father speak to thy brother Esau, saying: 'Bring me venison and prepare a savory food, that I may eat, and bless thee before the Lord before my death.'" Rebekah then instructs Jacob in an elaborate exercise in which Jacob pretends to be Esau, in order to steal from Esau his blessing from Isaac and his inheritance, which in theory Esau had already agreed to give to Jacob. Jacob follows through with the plan to steal his brother's birthright by bringing the meal his father Isaac requested and pretending to be Esau. Jacob pulled off his disguise by covering himself in hairy kid goat skin so that when his blind father went to touch him, his smooth skin did not give him away as an imposter of his hairy brother. Jacob successfully received his father Isaac's blessing (Genesis 27:27–29). As a result, Jacob became the spiritual leader of the family after Isaac's death, and the heir of the promises of Abraham (Genesis 27:37).

When Esau learns of his brother's deception, he is livid and begs his father to undo the blessing. Isaac responds to his eldest son's plea by saying that he only had one blessing to give and that he could not reverse the sacred blessing. Isaac promises Esau a life of service to his brother instead (Genesis 27:39–40). Esau is furious and vows to kill Jacob (Genesis 27:41). Once again Rebekah intervenes to save her younger son from being murdered by his elder twin brother, Esau. At Rebekah's urging, Jacob then flees to a distant land, Paddan-aram (towards Harran) to work for his uncle Laban (Genesis 28:5). Jacob does not immediately receive his father's inheritance after the impersonation aimed at taking it from Esau. Having fled for his life, Jacob has left the wealth of Isaac's flocks, land and tents in Esau's hands. Jacob is forced to sleep out on the open ground and then work for wages as a servant in Laban's household. Jacob, who had deceived and cheated his brother, is in turn deceived and cheated by his uncle. Jacob asks to marry Laban's daughter Rachel, whom he has met at the well, and Laban agrees, if Jacob will give him seven years of service. Jacob does so, but after the wedding finds that beneath the veil is not Rachel but Leah, Laban's elder daughter. He agrees to work another seven years and Jacob and Rachel are finally wed. However, despite Laban, Jacob eventually becomes so rich as to incite the envy of Laban and Laban's sons.

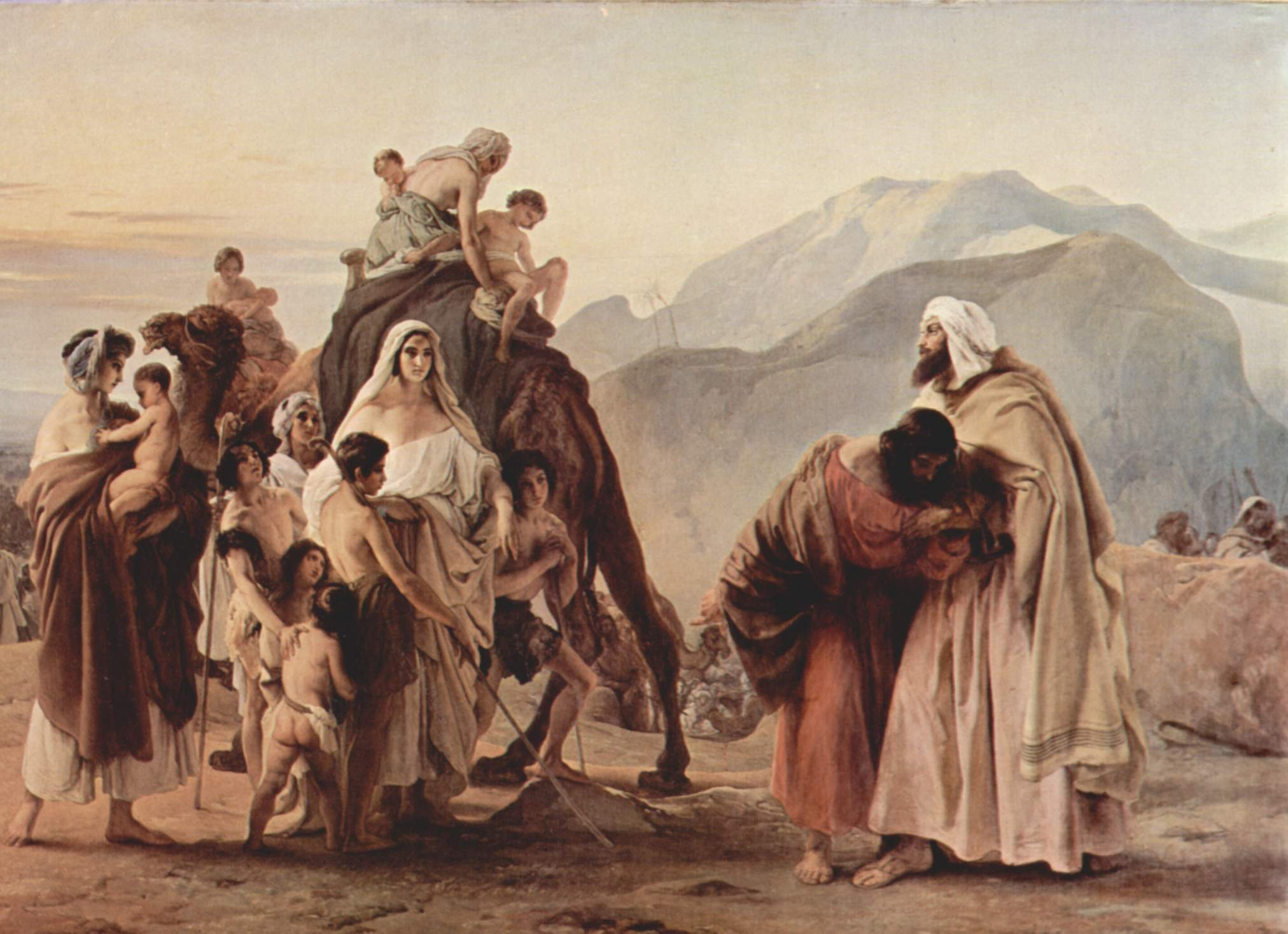
Francesco Hayez: Esau and Jacob reconcile (1844)

Genesis 32–33 tells of Jacob's and Esau's eventual reconciliation. Jacob sends multiple waves of gifts to Esau as they approach each other, hoping that Esau will spare his life. Esau refuses the gifts, as he is now very wealthy and does not need them. Jacob bows down before Esau and insists on his receiving the gifts. Esau shows forgiveness in spite of this bitter conflict. He then asks Jacob to follow him to the South but Jacob decides later to move to the North.

==== Family ====
Genesis 26:34–35 describes Esau's marriage at the age of forty to two Canaanite women: Judith, the daughter of Beeri the Hittite, and Basemath the daughter of Elon the Hittite. This arrangement grieved his parents. Later, upon seeing that his brother was blessed and that their father rejected Esau's unions with the Canaanites, Esau went to the house of his uncle Ishmael and married his cousin, Mahalath the daughter of Ishmael, and sister of Nebaioth.

Esau's family is again revisited in Genesis 36. This passage names two Canaanite wives; Adhah, the daughter of Elon the Hittite, and Aholibamah, the daughter of Anah, daughter of Zibeon the Hivite, and a third: Bashemath, Ishmael's daughter, sister of Nebaioth. Some scholars equate the three wives mentioned in Genesis 26 and 28 with those in Genesis 36. Casting his lot with the Ishmaelites, he was able to drive the Horites out of Mount Seir to settle in that region. According to some views, Esau is considered to be the progenitor not only of the Edomites but of the Kenizzites and the Amalekites as well.

Esau had five sons:

- Eliphaz, whose mother was Adah or Basemath
- Jeush, Jaalam, Korah, whose mother was Aholibamah or Judith
- Reuel, whose mother was Basemath or Machalas Bas Yishmael

==== Later developments ====
Genesis 35:29 records that Esau and Jacob administered the burial of Isaac after his death. The preceding verse 27 refers to Jacob visiting Isaac before his death, but not Esau.

==== Family tree ====
Family of Esau

Terah
Sarah	Abraham	Hagar	Haran
Nahor
Ishmael	Milcah	Lot	Iscah
Ishmaelites	7 sons	Bethuel	1st daughter	2nd daughter
Isaac	Rebecca	Laban	Moabites	Ammonites
Jacob	Rachel
Bilhah
Zilpah
Leah
1. Reuben; 2. Simeon; 3. Levi; 4. Judah; 9. Issachar; 10. Zebulun; 11. Dinah	7. Gad; 8. Asher	5. Dan; 6. Naphtali	12. Joseph; 13. Benjamin
Esau	Adah
Aholibamah
Mahalath/ Basemath
Reuel	Jeush	Jaalam	Korah	Eliphaz

=== Minor prophets ===
Esau was also known as Edom, the progenitor of the Edomites who were established to the south of the Israelites. They were an ancient enemy nation of Israel. The minor prophets, such as Obadiah, claim that the Edomites participated in the destruction of Solomon's Temple in the siege of Jerusalem in 587 BCE. Exactly how the Edomites participated is not clear. Psalm 137 ("By the waters of Babylon") suggests merely that Edom had encouraged the Babylonians: God is asked to "remember against the Edomites the day of Jerusalem, how they said 'raze it, raze it to its foundations'" in Psalm 137:7. However, the prophecy of Obadiah insists on the literal "violence done" by Esau "unto [his] brother Jacob" when the Edomites "entered the gate of my people..., looted his goods..., stood at the parting of the ways to cut off the fugitive,... delivered up his survivors on his day of distress".

== Other texts ==
By the intertestamental period, Edom had replaced Babylon as the nation that burned the Temple ("Thou hast also vowed to build thy temple, which the Edomites burned when Judah was laid waste by the Chaldees").

=== Jubilees ===
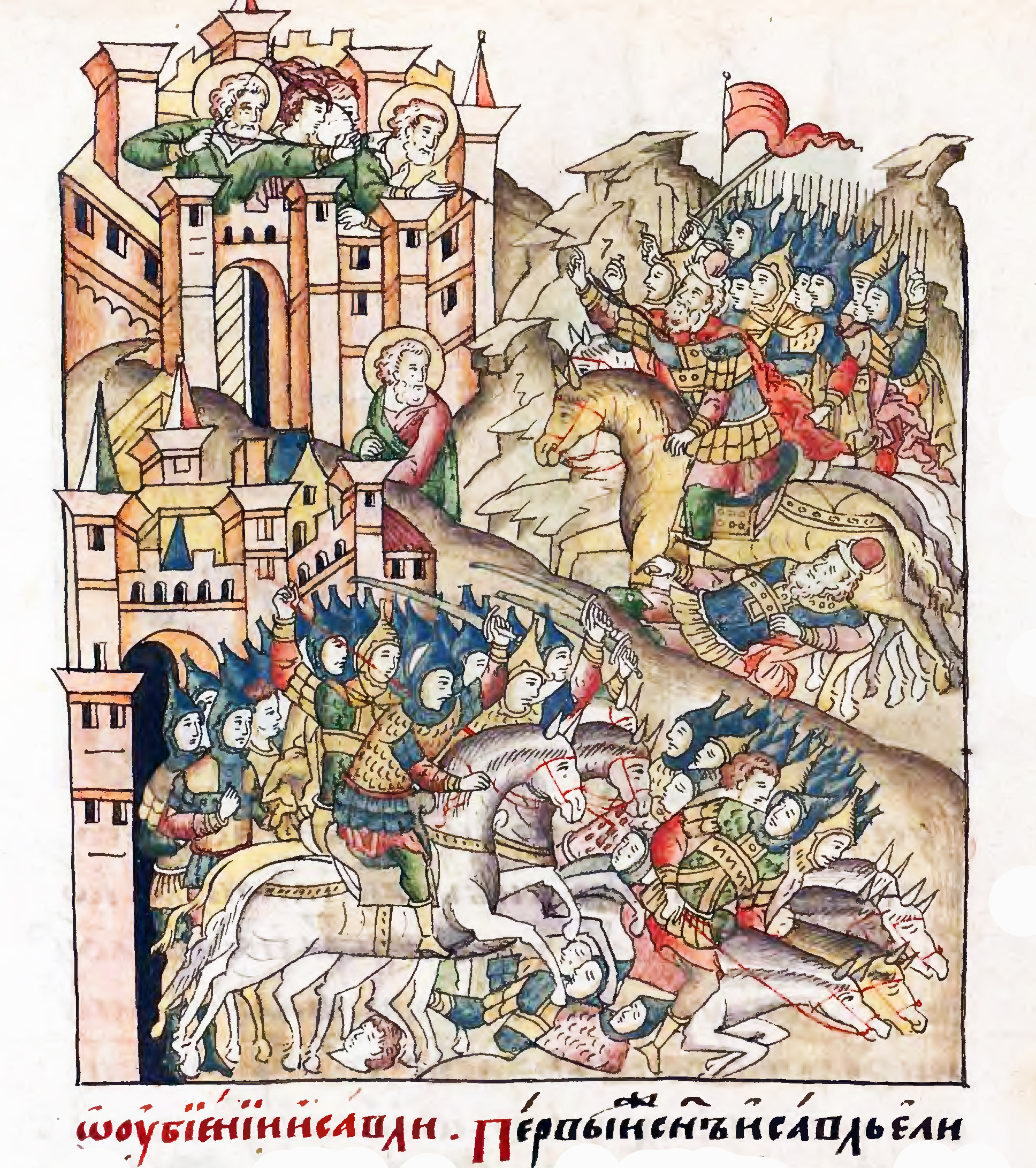
Isaac kills Esau

In the Book of Jubilees, Esau's father, Isaac, compels Esau to swear not to attack or kill Jacob after Isaac has died. However, after the death of Isaac, the sons of Esau convince their father to lead them and hire mercenaries against Jacob to kill Jacob and his family and seize their wealth (especially the portion of Isaac's wealth that Isaac had left to Jacob upon his death). "Then Ya'aqov bent his bow and sent forth the arrow and struck Esau, his brother on his right breast and slew him (Jubilees 38:2) . . . Ya'aqov buried his brother on the hill which is in Aduram, and he returned to his house (Jubilees 38:9b)."

=== New Testament ===
Hebrews 12:15–16 depicts Esau as unspiritual for thoughtlessly throwing away his birthright. Romans 9:13 states, "Jacob I loved, but Esau I hated," based upon Malachi 1:2–3.

=== In Islamic tradition ===
According to Islamic scholars, the prophet Ayyub was the great-grandson of Esau's son Reuel.

=== Rabbinic Jewish sources ===
The Targum Pseudo-Jonathan connects the name Esau to the Hebrew asah, stating, "because he was born fully completed, with hair of the head, beard, teeth, and molars". Other traditional sources connect the word with Hebrew: שָׁוְא, romanized: šāwʾ, lit. 'worthless'.

== Interpretation ==
Jewish commentaries adopt a negative view of Esau because of his rivalry with Jacob and likewise viewed the apparent reconciliation between the brothers described in Genesis 32–33 as insincere on Esau's part. The midrash says that during Rebecca's pregnancy, whenever she would pass a house of Torah study, Jacob would struggle to come out; whenever she would pass a house of idolatry, Esau would agitate to come out.

He is considered to be a rebellious son who kept a double life until he was fifteen, when he sold his birthright to Jacob. According to the Talmud, the sale of the birthright took place immediately after Abraham died. The Talmudic dating would give both Esau and Jacob an age of fifteen at the time. The lentils Jacob was cooking were meant for his father Isaac because lentils are the traditional mourner's meal for Jews. On that day before returning, in a rage over the death of Abraham, Esau committed five sins; he raped a betrothed young woman, he committed murder (Nimrod), he denied God, he denied the resurrection of the dead, and he spurned his birthright.

Haman's lineage is given in the Targum Sheni as follows: "Haman the son of Hammedatha the Agagite, son of Srach, son of Buza, son of Iphlotas, son of Dyosef, son of Dyosim, son of Prome, son of Ma'dei, son of Bla'akan, son of Intimros, son of Haridom, son of Sh'gar, son of Nigar, son of Farmashta, son of Vayezatha, (son of Agag, son of Sumkei,) son of Amalek, son of the concubine of Eliphaz, firstborn son of Esau".

According to Rashi, Isaac, when blessing Jacob in Esau's place, smelled the heavenly scent of Gan Eden (Paradise) when Jacob entered his room and, in contrast, perceived Gehenna opening beneath Esau when the latter entered the room, showing him that he had been deceived all along by Esau's show of piety.

In Jewish folklore, the Roman emperor Titus was a descendant of Esau.

In Christian writings, the gestational struggle between the unborn twins is seen as prefiguring the later hostility between Israel and Edom.

=== Death ===
According to the Babylonian Talmud, Esau was killed by Hushim, son of Dan, son of Jacob, because Esau obstructed the burial of Jacob into the cave of Machpelah. When Jacob was brought to be buried in the cave, Esau prevented the burial, claiming he had the right to be buried in the cave; after some negotiation Naphtali was sent to Egypt to retrieve the document stating Esau sold his part in the cave to Jacob. Hushim (who was hard of hearing) did not understand what was going on, and why his grandfather was not being buried, so he asked for an explanation; after being given one he became angry and said: "Is my grandfather to lie there in contempt until Naphtali returns from the land of Egypt?" He then took a club and killed Esau, and Esau's head rolled into the cave. This means that the head of Esau is also buried in the cave.

Jewish sources state that Esau sold his right to be buried in the cave. According to Shemot Rabbah, Jacob gave all his possessions to acquire a tomb in the Cave of the Patriarchs. He put a large pile of gold and silver before Esau and asked, "My brother, do you prefer your portion of this cave, or all this gold and silver?" Esau's selling to Jacob his right to be buried in the Cave of the Patriarchs is also recorded in Sefer HaYashar.

== Reputed grave on the West Bank ==
South of the Palestinian town of Sa'ir on the West Bank there is a tomb reputed to be that of Esau – El 'Ais in his Arab name.

The PEF's Survey of Western Palestine (SWP) wrote:

The tomb is in a chamber 37 feet east and west by 20 feet north and south, with a Mihrab on the south wall. The tomb is 12 feet long, 3 1/2 feet broad, 5 feet high, covered with a dark green cloth and a canopy above. An ostrich egg is hung near. North of the chamber is a vaulted room of equal size, and to the east is an open court with a fig-tree, and a second cenotaph rudely plastered, said to be that of Esau's slave. Rock-cut tombs exist south-west of this place.

The SWP stated this identification was false and that Esau's tomb was in the Biblical Mount Seir.

== Gallery ==
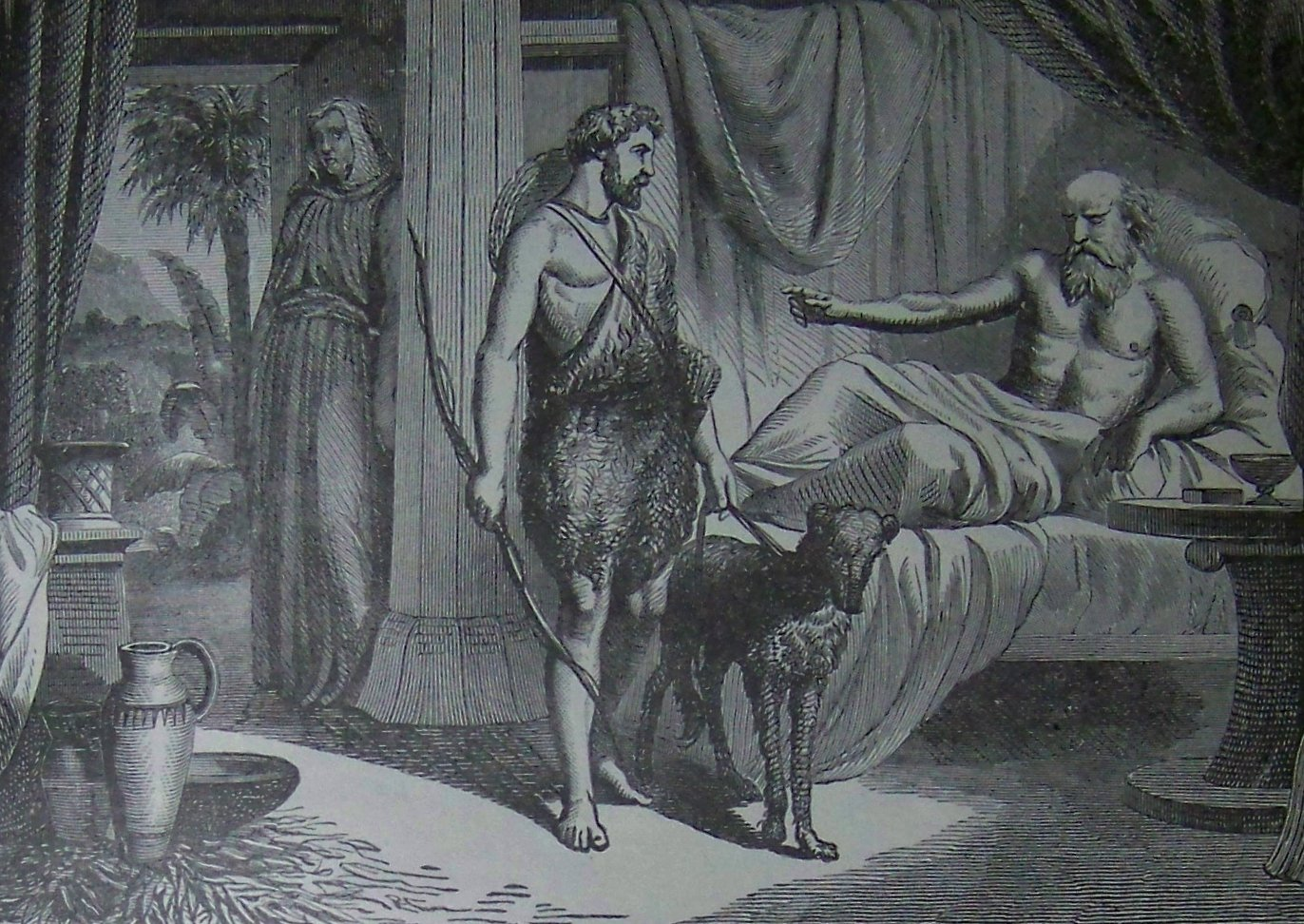
Esau Going for Venison (illustration from the 1890 Holman Bible)

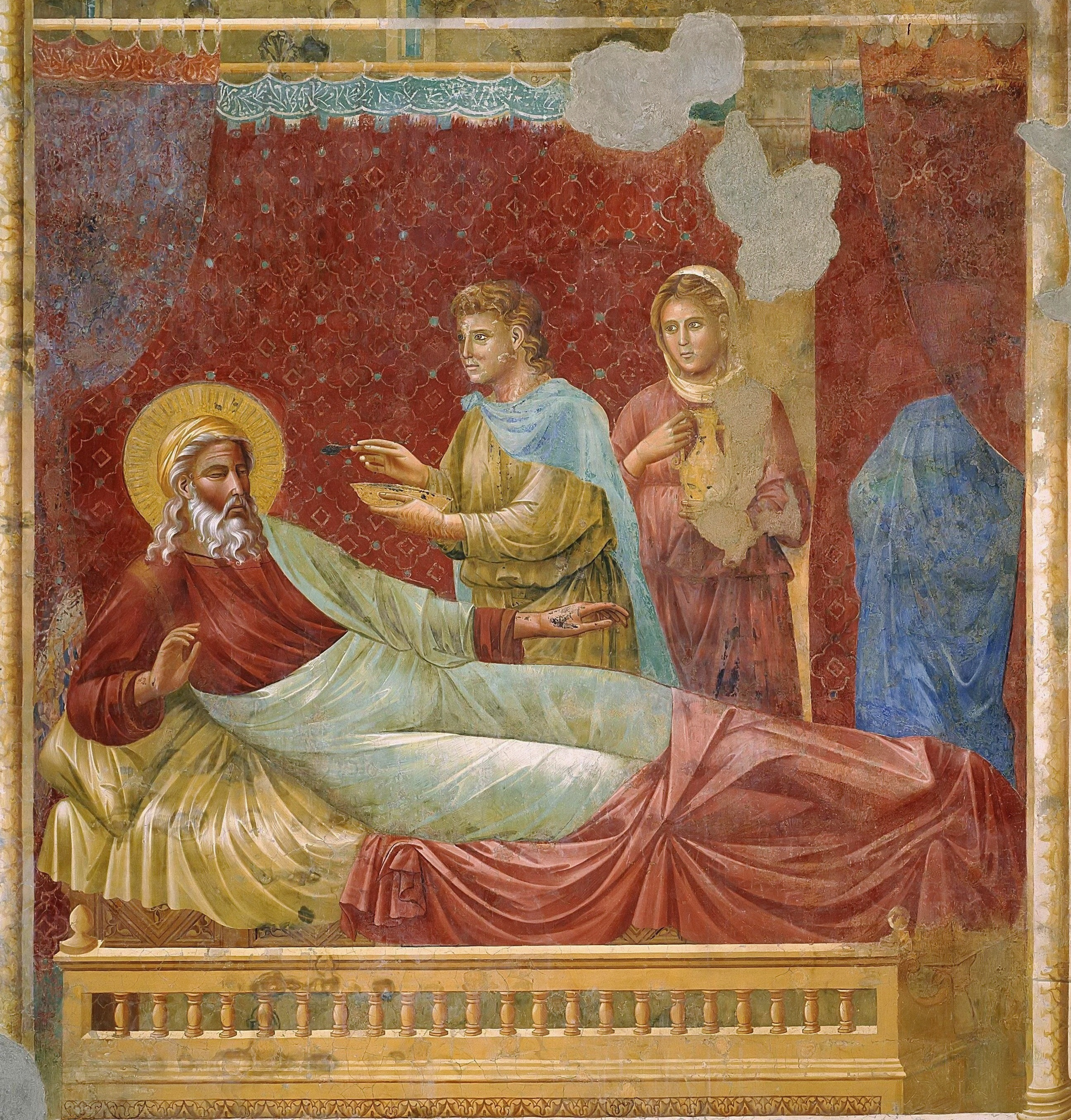
Isaac upon Esau's Return (fresco circa 1292–1294 by Giotto di Bondone)

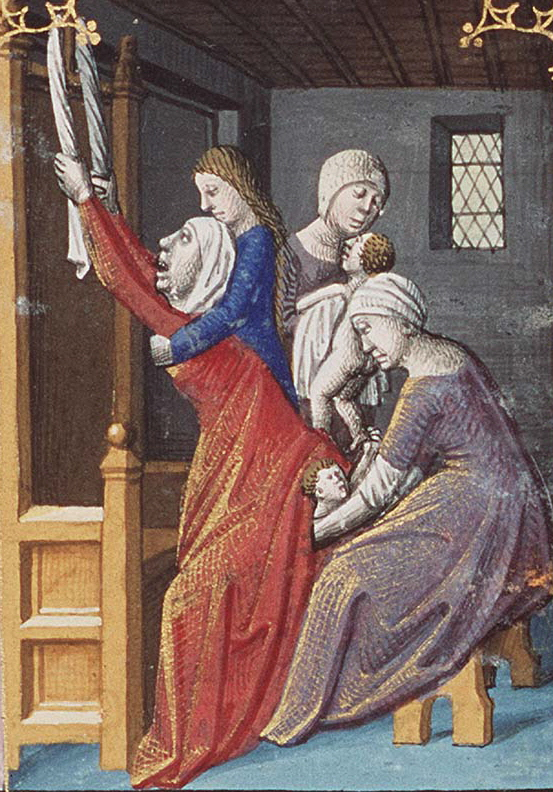
Birth of Esau and Jacob (illumination circa 1475–1480 by François Maitre from Augustine's La Cité de Dieu, at the Museum Meermanno-Westreenianum)

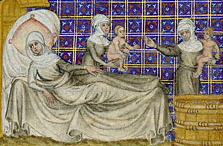
The Birth of Esau and Jacob (illumination by Master of Jean de Mandeville, Paris, from a Bible Historiale c. 1360–1370)

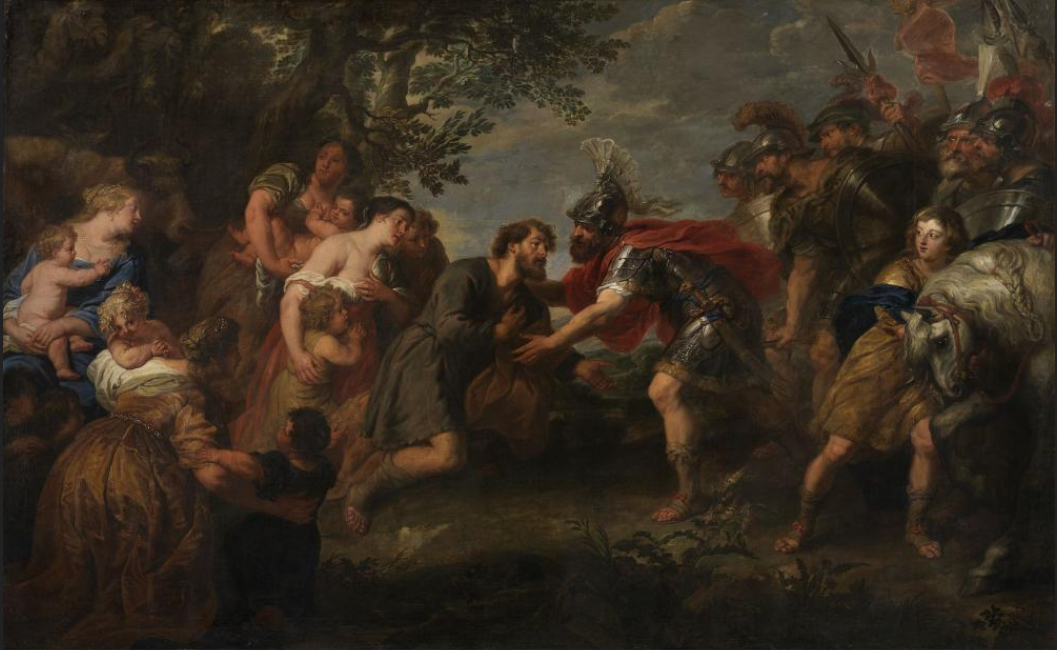
The reconciliation of Jacob and Esau (1640 painting by Jan van den Hoecke)

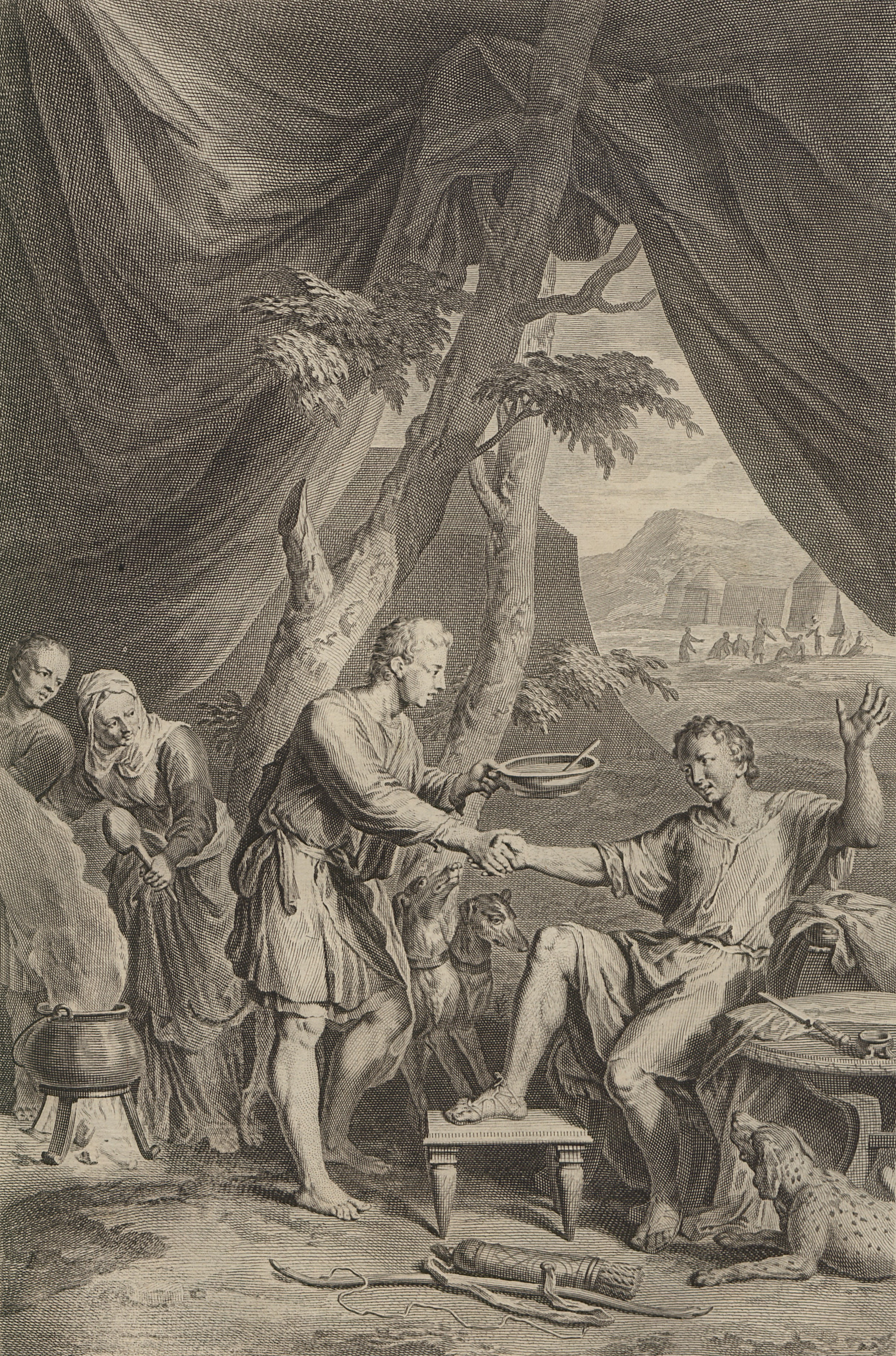
Esau Sells His Birthright (from the 1728 Figures de la Bible)

== Bibliography ==
- Metzger, Bruce M.; Coogan, Michael D., eds. (1993). The Oxford Companion to the Bible. Oxford, UK: Oxford University Press. ISBN 978-0-19-504645-8.
