= Return to Zion =

Biblical event

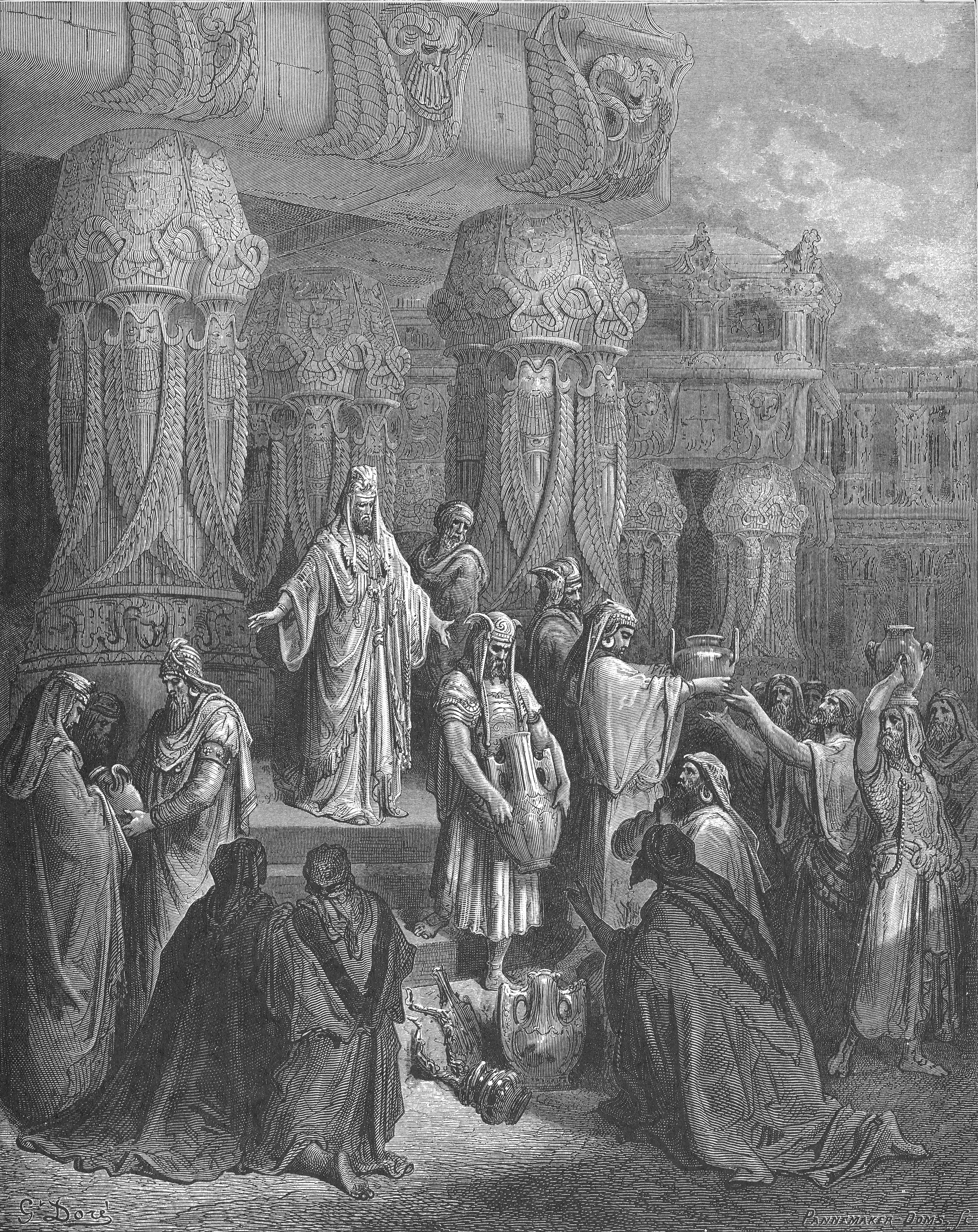
Cyrus restoring the vessels of the temple, by Gustave Doré

The return to Zion (Hebrew: שִׁיבָת צִיּוֹן or שבי ציון, Shivat Tzion or Shavei Tzion, lit. 'Zion returnees') is an event recorded in Ezra–Nehemiah of the Hebrew Bible, in which the Jews of the Kingdom of Judah—subjugated by the Neo-Babylonian Empire—were freed from the Babylonian captivity following the Persian conquest of Babylon. In 539 BCE, the Persian king Cyrus the Great issued the Edict of Cyrus allowing the Jews to return to Jerusalem and the Land of Judah, which was made a self-governing Jewish province under the new Persian Empire.

The Persian period marks the onset of the Second Temple period in Jewish history. Zerubabel, appointed as governor of Judah by the Persian king, oversaw the construction of the Second Temple. Later, prominent leaders like Nehemiah and Ezra emerged. Nehemiah's activities dated to the third quarter of the fifth century BCE, while the precise period of Ezra's activity remains a subject of debate. Their efforts to rebuild the social and spiritual life of the Jewish returnees in their ancestral homeland are chronicled in the biblical books named after them. These texts also document the interactions of the Jews with neighboring figures, including Sanballat the Horonite, likely the governor of Samaria, Tobiah the Ammonite, who likely owned lands in Ammon, and Geshem the Arabian, king of the Qedarites, all of whom opposed Nehemiah's efforts to rebuild Jerusalem.

One of the significant achievements of the Persian period was the canonization of the Torah, a topic of enduring scholarly interest due to its profound impact on Western civilization. Traditionally attributed to Ezra, who presented the "Torah of Moses" to the people of Judah, possibly around 398 BCE, this process of creating a unified book of rules played an important role in fostering the distinctive identity of the Jews during this period.

Babylonian texts, archaeological evidence, and population estimates suggest that only a small group of exiles, likely around 4,000, returned to Judah over several decades, contrary to the figure of 42,360 listed in Ezra 2.

== Babylonian exile ==
The Neo-Babylonian Empire under the rule of Nebuchadnezzar II occupied the Kingdom of Judah between 597–586 BCE and destroyed the First Temple in Jerusalem. According to the Hebrew Bible, the last king of Judah, Zedekiah, was forced to watch his sons put to death, then his own eyes were put out and he was exiled to Babylon (2 Kings 25).

== Return to Zion ==
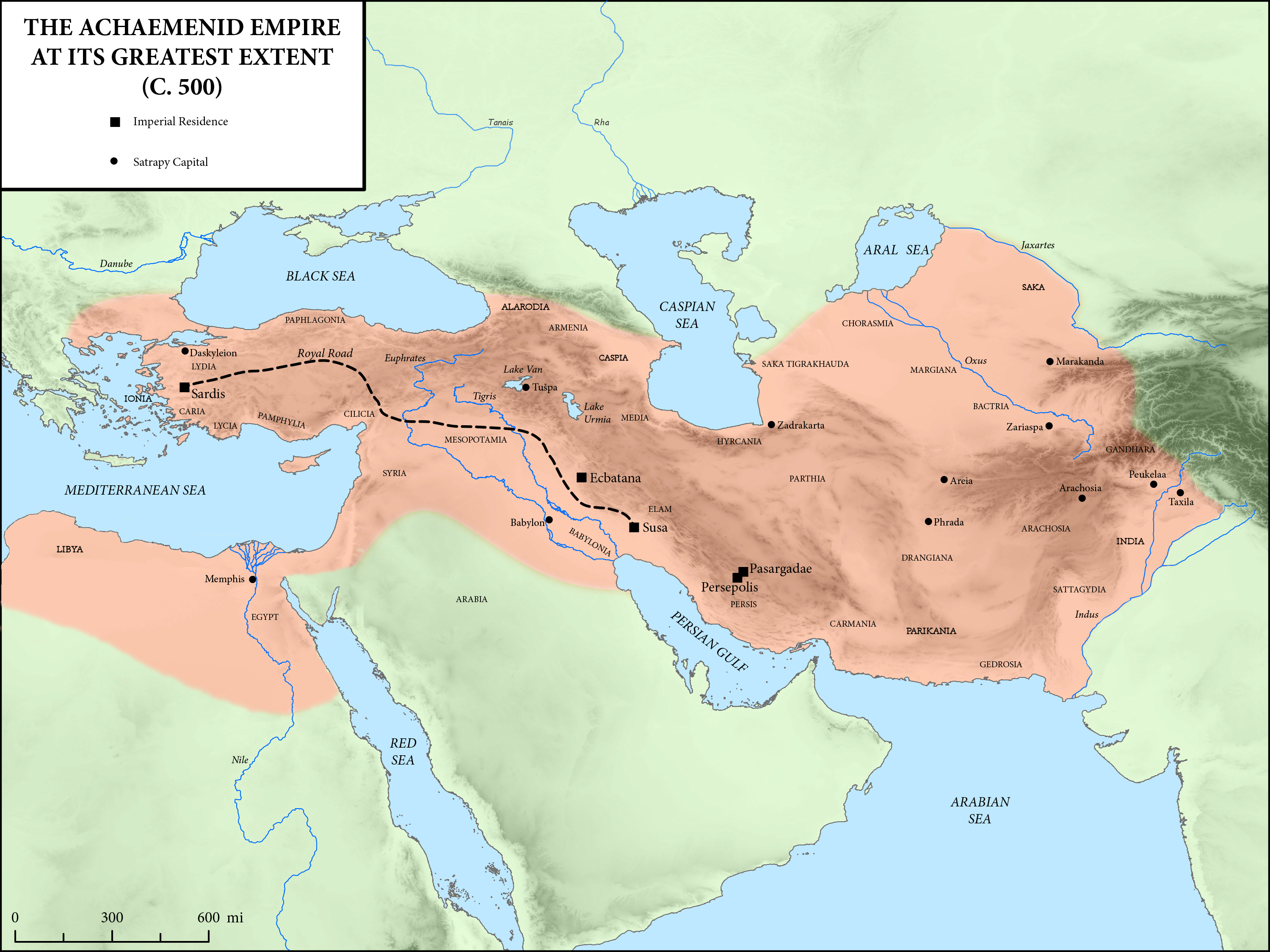
the Achaemenid Empire

According to the books of Ezra–Nehemiah, a number of decades later in 538 BCE, the Jews in Babylon were allowed to return to the Land of Judah, due to Cyrus's decree. Initially, around 50,000 Jews returned to the Land of Judah following the decree of Cyrus as described in Ezra, whereas some remained in Babylon. Later, an unknown number of exiles returned from Babylon with Ezra himself. The return of the deportees to Judah during the next 110 years is known as the return to Zion, an event by which Jews ever since have been inspired.

=== Yehud Medinata ===
The returnees settled in what became known as Yehud Medinata or Yehud. Yehud Medinata was a self-governing Jewish province under the rule of the Achaemenid Empire which even issued their own Yehud coinage inscribed with the three letters Y-H-D.

== Biblical account ==
According to the books of Ezra–Nehemiah in the Hebrew Bible, the return to Zion occurred in several waves: those of Sheshbazzar, Zerubbabel, Ezra, and Nehemiah.

=== Sheshbazzar's return ===
The Book of Ezra first depicts the return of Sheshbazzar at the behest of the Persian King Cyrus in 538 BC, the first year after he conquered Babylon:

7 And King Cyrus took out all the vessels of the House of the Lord, which Nebuchadnezzar had taken out of Jerusalem and had placed them in the temple of his god;
8 Now Cyrus, the king of Persia, took them out by the hand of Mithredath the treasurer, and he counted them out to Sheshbazzar, the prince of Judah…

11 All the vessels of silver and gold were five thousand, four hundred; Sheshbazzar brought up everything when the exiles were brought up from Babylon to Jerusalem.

— Book of Ezra 1:7–8,11

=== Zerubbabel's return ===
The second migration recounted in the Book of Ezra is that of Zerubbabel (either in 538 BC with the first wave or 520 BC, the second year of Darius I, when work resumed). According to the apocryphal book of 1 Esdras, this was the result of Zerubbabel's victory in a contest of wits under King Darius.

This wave included 42,360 people, not including servants or handmaids. Among them, there were 24,144 ordinary men (57%) and 12,452 women and children (29%). There were also 4,289 priests (10%), 74 regular Levites, 128 singer Levites, 139 gatekeeper Levites, and 392 Nethinim temple assistants. The count was completed by 652 people of unknown ancestry and another unspecified 90. The addition of 7,337 servants and handmaids boosted the population to 49,697. Their working animals included 736 horses (one for every 68 people), 246 mules (one per 202), 435 camels (one per 114), and 6,720 donkeys (one per 7).

=== Ezra's return ===
The third migration was led by Ezra the scribe in the seventh year of Artaxerxes I (458 or 457 BC). According to the Talmud, he delayed his return to Judah to stay with his rabbi, Baruch ben Neriah, the renowned disciple of Jeremiah who was too old and weak to travel.

Ezra returned with the approval of the Persian government and license to spend all donations to the Jerusalem holy temple. He was also permitted to transfer the returned holy vessels to the Temple, and a decree allocated them government money, wheat, wine and oil. In addition, all who served in the holy temple, the priests, Levites and Nethinim were given tax exemption, and Ezra was authorized to appoint magistrates and judges and to teach the law of God to the people of Judah, as well as judicial authority to impose penalties of confiscation, banishment or execution.

=== Nehemiah's return ===
The fourth migration was led by Nehemiah, who was granted a leave of absence to rebuild Jerusalem and repair its city walls in the twentieth year of Artaxerxes I (445 or 444 BC). He was given permission to cut down woods and was escorted by Persian troops.

Due to economic distress in Judea, Nehemiah faced a public crisis during the repairing of the walls of Jerusalem. Nehemiah heard the Jewish people's complaints and got angry at the profiteering of the Jewish nobles and officials, especially those serving in the holy temple who were exempt from the heavy Persian taxes. Nehemiah assembled a public hearing and urged the nobles to restore confiscated fields and houses and forgive loans. He was the first to do so, proclaiming that he and his close associates would forgive their debts. He put the nobles under oath to fulfill their promises. On the twenty-fifth day of the month of Elul, 52 days after the work began, the whole wall was completed.

== Cyrus cylinder ==
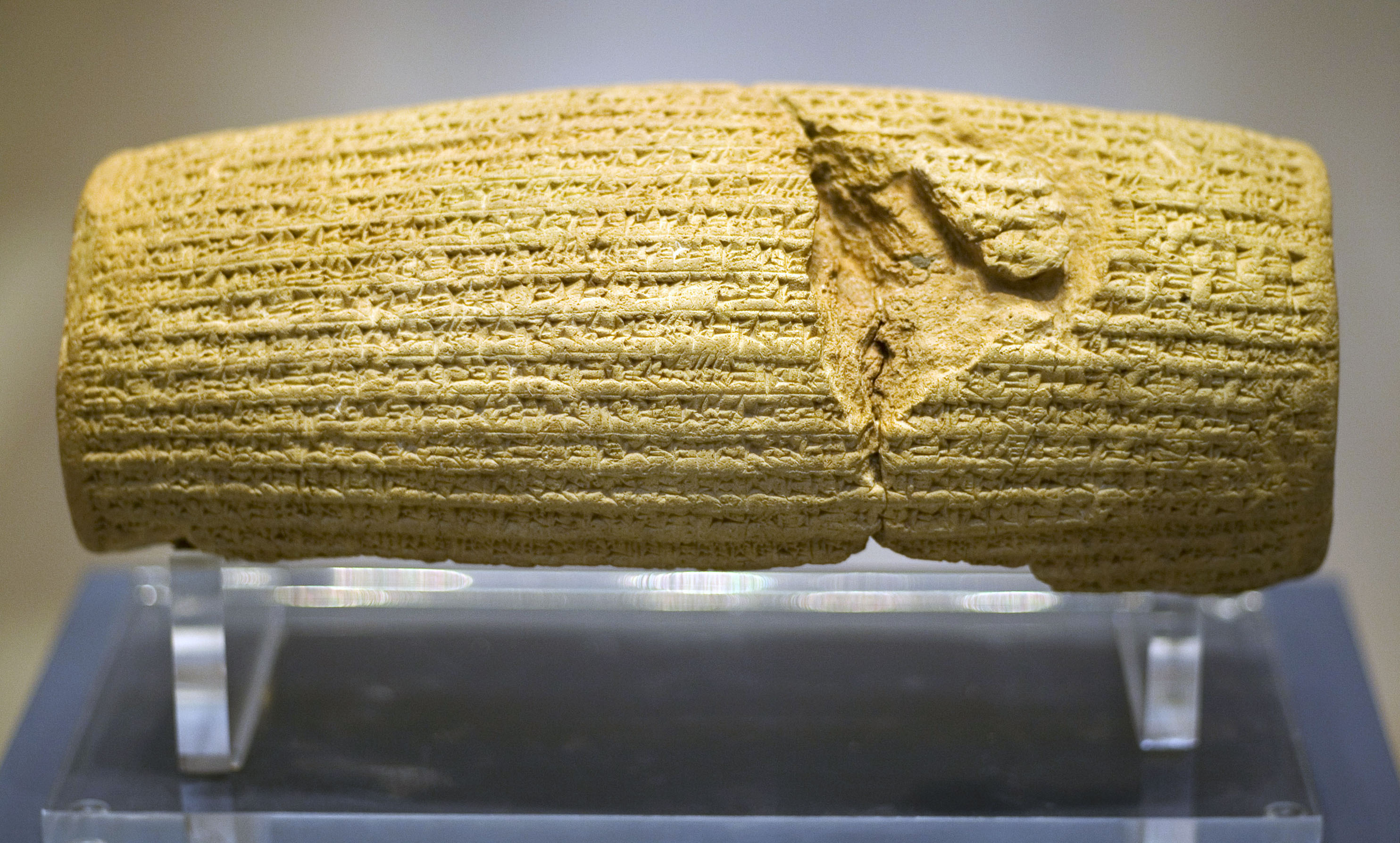
The Cyrus Cylinder

The biblical Book of Ezra includes two texts said to be decrees of Cyrus the Great allowing the deported Jews to return to their homeland after decades and ordering the Temple rebuilt. The differences in content and tone of the two decrees, one in Hebrew and one in Aramaic, have caused some scholars to question their authenticity. The Cyrus Cylinder, an ancient tablet on which is written a declaration in the name of Cyrus referring to restoration of temples and repatriation of exiled peoples, has often been taken as corroboration of the authenticity of the biblical decrees attributed to Cyrus, but other scholars point out that the cylinder's text is specific to Babylon and Mesopotamia and makes no mention of Judah or Jerusalem. Professor Lester L Grabbe asserted that the "alleged decree of Cyrus" regarding Judah, "cannot be considered authentic", but that there was a "general policy of allowing deportees to return and to re-establish cult sites". He also stated that archaeology suggests that the return was a "trickle" taking place over decades, rather than a single event.

== In the diaspora ==
In the middle of the 5th century BCE, the exiled Judean communities experienced a significant national awakening. It has been demonstrated that the Judean residents of Nippur, the majority of whom had names of Babylonian origin, suddenly began giving their children Judean theophoric names.

== See also ==
- Gathering of Israel
- History of ancient Israel and Judah
- History of Zionism
- Jewish diaspora
- Persian Jews
- Pre-Modern Aliyah
- Proto-Zionism
- Shavei Zion (a Moshav of cooperative agricultural community)
- Yehud (today a city in Israel)
- Yom HaAliyah
