= Sanballat =

Sanballat was the name of several governors of Samaria during the Achaemenid and Hellenistic periods:

- Sanballat the Horonite, or Sanballat I, governed in the mid- to late-5th century BCE; was a contemporary of Nehemiah
- Sanballat II, grandson of the former, governed mid-4th century BCE
- Sanballat III, governed around the time of Alexander the Great
- Sanballat IV
- Sanballat V
