= Nehemiah 6 =

Chapter in the Book of Nehemiah

- ← chapter 5 chapter 7 →
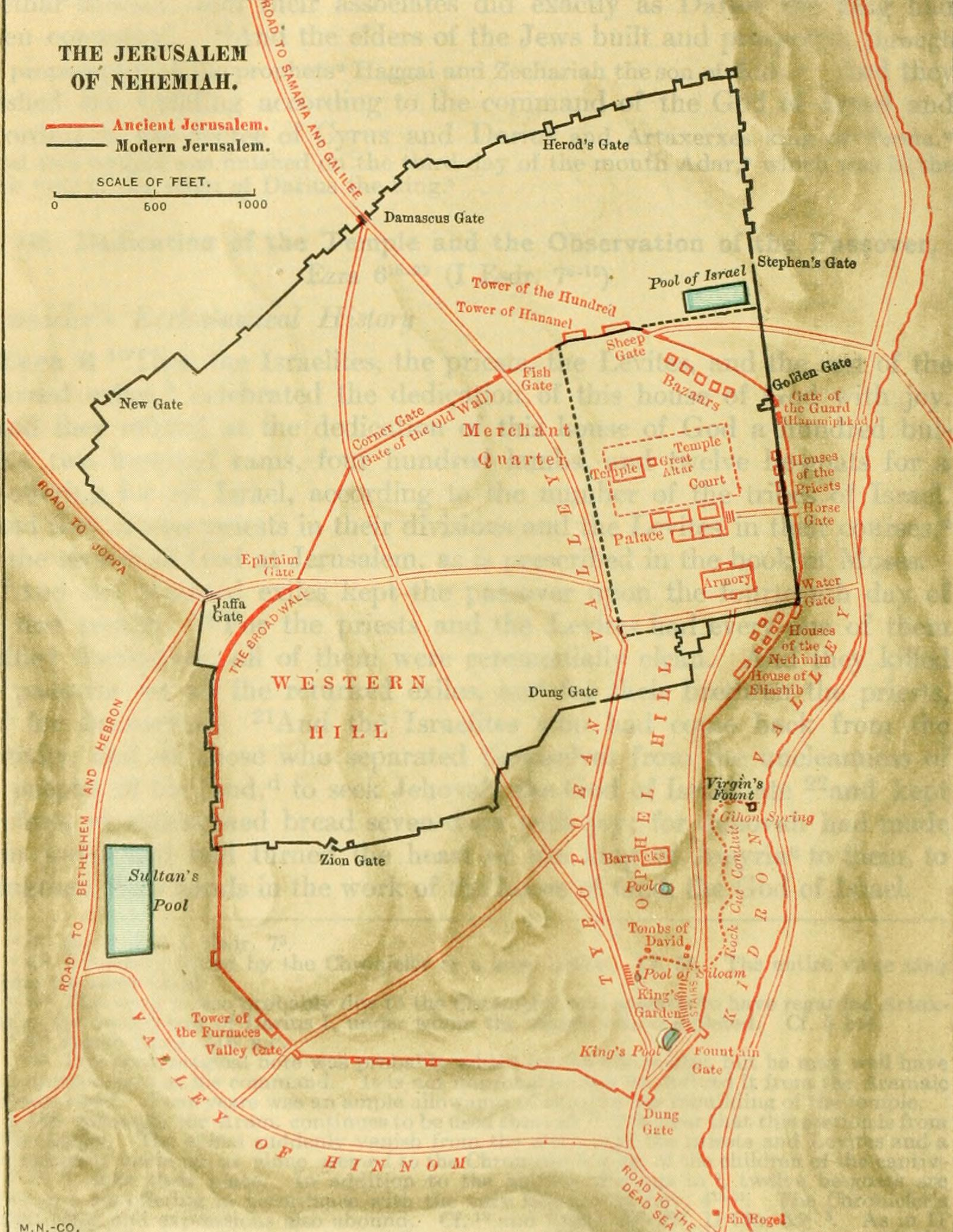
- The map of Jerusalem in Nehemiah’s time. In: ‘’The Student's Old Testament” (1904).
- Book: Book of Nehemiah
- Category: Ketuvim
- Christian Bible part: Old Testament
- Order in the Christian part: 16

Nehemiah 6 is the sixth chapter of the Book of Nehemiah in the Old Testament of the Christian Bible, or the 16th chapter of the book of Ezra-Nehemiah in the Hebrew Bible, which treats the book of Ezra and the book of Nehemiah as one book. Jewish tradition states that Ezra is the author of Ezra-Nehemiah as well as the Book of Chronicles, but modern scholars generally accept that a compiler from the 5th century BCE (the so-called "Chronicler") is the final author of these books. This chapter records the continuing opposition to Nehemiah from sources both external (Sanballat, Tobiah, and their allies) and internal (the prophetess Noadiah and the rest of the prophets).

== Text ==
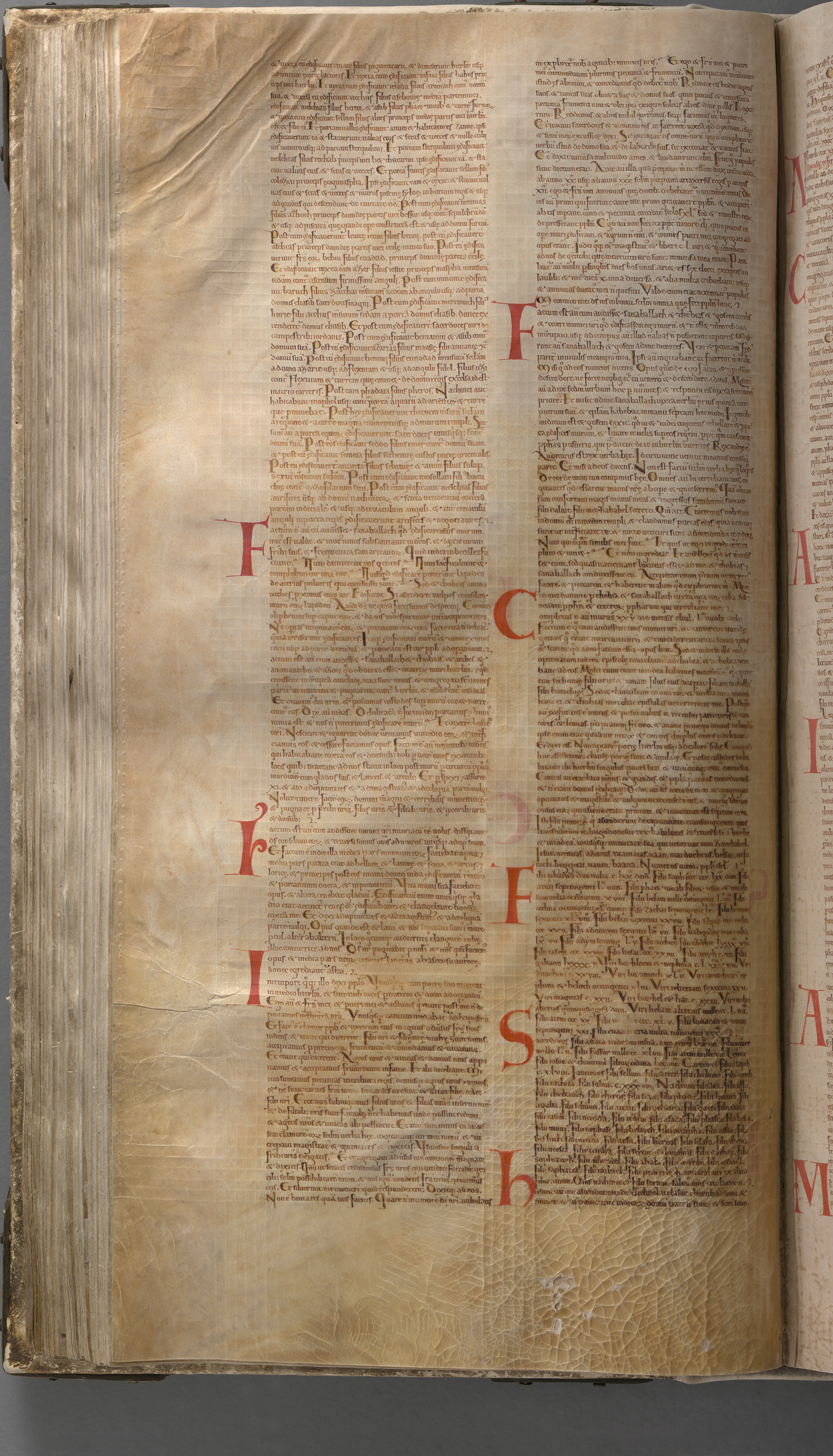
A page containing the Latin text of Nehemiah 3:8–7:61 in the Codex Gigas (English: Giant Book), the largest extant medieval manuscript in the world (from 13th century).

The original text of this chapter is in Hebrew language. This chapter is divided into 19 verses.

=== Textual witnesses ===
Some early manuscripts containing the text of this chapter in Hebrew are of the Masoretic Text, which includes Codex Leningradensis (1008). (Note: Since the anti-Jewish riots in Aleppo in 1947, the whole book of Ezra-Nehemiah has been missing from the text of the Aleppo Codex.)

There is also a translation into Koine Greek known as the Septuagint, made in the last few centuries BCE. Extant ancient manuscripts of the Septuagint version include Codex Vaticanus (B; $\mathfrak{G}$^{B}; 4th century), Codex Sinaiticus (S; BHK: $\mathfrak{G}$^{S}; 4th century), and Codex Alexandrinus (A; $\mathfrak{G}$^{A}; 5th century).

== The pretense of peace (6:1-4) ==
As a leader, Nehemiah holds his motives and conduct blameless, but at the same time, he must understand and deal wisely with the opposition 'who seek to compromise God's work'.

=== Verses 1–2 ===
^{1} Now it happened when Sanballat, Tobiah, Geshem the Arab, and the rest of our enemies heard that I had rebuilt the wall, and that there were no breaks left in it (though at that time I had not hung the doors in the gates), ^{2} that Sanballat and Geshem sent to me, saying, "Come, let us meet together among the villages in the plain of Ono." But they thought to do me harm.

Tobiah is described as an Ammonite in Nehemiah 4:3

- "Geshem": or "Gashmu" (see verse 6).
- "Among the villages": or "in Kephirim", exact location unknown.

== The trap of intimidation (6:5-9) ==
Sanballat hoped that Nehemiah would follow the logical action against the rumors of threats, the way he and his allies would do, that is, 'given to ambition, opportunistic maneuvering, and dedicated to self-preservation', but Nehemiah 'refused to become distracted by the ploy of politics' and kept his devotion to God.

=== Verse 5 ===
Then Sanballat sent his servant to me as before, the fifth time, with an open letter in his hand.

Sanballat sent his fifth letter as an open letter, because he is 'well aware of the possibility that popular sentiment will stand behind a claim to restore an independent Judah', and uses it to launch an accusation that Nehemiah is sponsoring prophetic supports (indicating the importance of prophetic authority in Ezra–Nehemiah).

=== Verse 6 ===
In it was written, "It is reported among the nations, and Geshem also says it, that you and the Jews intend to rebel; that is why you are building the wall. And according to these reports you wish to become their king."

- "Geshem": written in Hebrew as "Gashmu".

== The lure of safety (6:10-14) ==
In this section, Nehemiah remembers that the will of God is eternal and has primacy over any individual.

=== Verse 10 ===
Then I went to the house of Shemaiah son of Delaiah, the son of Mehetabel. He was confined to his home. He said, "Let’s set up a time to meet in the house of God, within the temple. Let’s close the doors of the temple, for they are coming to kill you. It will surely be at night that they will come to kill you."

- "Confined to his home": from Hebrew: עָצ֑וּר, ‘ā-tsūr, "a secret informer", or "shut in" (KJV: "shut up"), but the reason for his confinement is not stated, although BDB 783 s.v. עָצַר suggests that 'it had to do with the fulfillment of a vow or was related to an issue of ceremonial uncleanness'.

== Continued opposition (6:15-19) ==
The establishment of fortifications does not provide full security, as continued opposition remains in place; dangers can always threaten the community of faith, but ... the godly character of the people is the greatest defense against the threats.

=== Verse 15 ===
So the wall was finished in the twenty and fifth day of the month Elul, in fifty and two days.

- "Elul": The month in Hebrew calendar, which is the same as the Assyrian month U-lu-lu and corresponds to the end of August and beginning of September in the Gregorian calendar.
- "Fifty and two days" would cover a period from July 25 to September 15, which may correspond to the 25th of Elul. The Jerusalem Bible suggests that the completion date may have been early October, 445 BC.

=== Verse 17 ===
Moreover in those days the nobles of Judah sent many letters unto Tobiah, and the letters of Tobiah came unto them.

- "The nobles" (from Hebrew: חֹרֵ֤י, ḥō-rê) were the leaders of the Jews; they continued to have correspondence with Tobiah, apparently because there were intermarriages with Tobiah's family. Tobiah continues to be a threat as he is closely related to the people with whom Nehemiah must deal later (see Nehemiah 13).

=== Verse 19 ===
Moreover, they kept reporting to me his good deeds and then telling him what I said. And Tobiah sent letters to intimidate me.

The nobles of Judah acted as intermediaries: they "endeavoured to convince Nehemiah that Tobiah’s professions of goodwill were sincere ... and on the other hand they communicated to Tobiah all that Nehemiah said and did". Anglican commentator H. E. Ryle suggests that their aim was to supply Tobiah with "material for charges against Nehemiah to be made before the Persian king, or for slanders to the Jewish people".

== See also ==
- Jerusalem
- Prophetess
- Related Bible parts: Nehemiah 2, Nehemiah 13

== Sources ==
- Fensham, F. Charles (1982). The Books of Ezra and Nehemiah. New international commentary on the Old Testament (illustrated ed.). Wm. B. Eerdmans Publishing. ISBN 978-0802825278.
- Grabbe, Lester L. (2003). "Nehemiah". In Dunn, James D. G.; Rogerson, John William (eds.). Eerdmans Commentary on the Bible (illustrated ed.). Wm. B. Eerdmans Publishing. pp. 320–328. ISBN 978-0802837110.
- Halley, Henry H. (1965). Halley's Bible Handbook: an abbreviated Bible commentary (24th (revised) ed.). Zondervan Publishing House. ISBN 0-310-25720-4.
- Larson, Knute; Dahlen, Kathy; Anders, Max E. (2005). Anders, Max E. (ed.). Holman Old Testament Commentary - Ezra, Nehemiah, Esther. Vol. 9 (illustrated ed.). B&H Publishing Group. ISBN 978-0805494693.
- Levering, Matthew (2007). Ezra & Nehemiah. Brazos Theological Commentary on the Bible. Brazos Press. ISBN 978-1587431616.
- McConville, J. G. (1985). Ezra, Nehemiah, and Esther. The daily study Bible : Old Testament. Westminster John Knox Press. ISBN 978-0664245832.
- Smith-Christopher, Daniel L. (2007). "15. Ezra-Nehemiah". In Barton, John; Muddiman, John (eds.). The Oxford Bible Commentary (first (paperback) ed.). Oxford University Press. pp. 308–324. ISBN 978-0199277186.
- Würthwein, Ernst (1995). The Text of the Old Testament. Translated by Rhodes, Erroll F. Grand Rapids, MI: Wm. B. Eerdmans. ISBN 0-8028-0788-7.
