= Sanballat the Horonite =

Samarian official (5th century BCE)

Sanballat the Horonite (Biblical Hebrew: סַנְבַלַּט, romanized: Sanḇallaṭ), or Sanballat I, was a Samarian leader, official of the Achaemenid Empire, and contemporary of Nehemiah, the governor of Yehud province, who lived in the mid-to-late 5th century BC. He and his family are mentioned in the contemporary Elephantine papyri and ostraca as well as the Book of Nehemiah in the Hebrew Bible.

== Etymology ==
In Hebrew the name is Sanḇallaṭ (Hebrew: סַנְבַלַּט). Eberhard Schrader, cited in Brown–Driver–Briggs, considered that the name in Akkadian was Sīn-uballiṭ (Akkadian: *𒌍𒋾𒆷, 30.TI.LA), a theophoric name referring to the lunar deity Sīn, meaning "Sīn gave life." The name of the god Sīn in the context of Sanballat's name has since been mistakenly confused with the unrelated English noun sin in some popular English commentaries on the Book of Nehemiah. Other earlier commentators sometimes considered Sanballat a military rank rather than a name.

== Biblical account ==
=== Book of Nehemiah ===
Sanballat is best known from the Book of Nehemiah, which casts him as one of the chief opponents of Nehemiah, who had been appointed governor of Judah during efforts to rebuild the walls of Jerusalem and carry out religious reforms. In the Book of Nehemiah, he is called "the Horonite," Horon possibly identified with present-day Huwara. He was associated with Tobiah the Ammonite and Geshem the Arabian. His home was in the city of Samaria.

According to the narrative, when Nehemiah and his escort arrive in Jerusalem, their return arouses the hostility of Sanballat and his allies. Nehemiah 2:19 says, "When Sanballat the Horonite and Tobiah the Ammonite servant and Geshem the Arab heard, they mocked us and held us in contempt and said, 'What is this that you are doing? Are you rebelling against the king?'" Nehemiah resents their insinuation and tells them they have no right in Jerusalem or interest in its affairs. Tobiah appeases Sanballat by saying that a fox (or a jackal) climbing on their wall would break it down. Nehemiah and his builders hurry the work while Sanballat and his associates organize their forces to fight against Jerusalem.

In Nehemiah 6, Sanballat and his confederates challenge Nehemiah and his army to meet them in the villages of the Ono four times. However, Nehemiah only replies that he is busy rebuilding. Sanballat sends another message, stating that Nehemiah was making alliances against Assyria and planning a rebellion. Nehemiah replies, "None of these things you mention has occurred; they are figments of your imagination."

According to Nehemiah 6:10, Sanballat and local allies in Jerusalem attempt to entrap Nehemiah in the Second Temple, but the scheme fails. Sanballat's allies keep Sanballat and Tobiah informed about the progress of the reconstruction of Jerusalem. With the hand of God upon Nehemiah, along with Nehemiah's far-sighted policy and cunning, he is kept out of the hands of these neighboring foes.

According to Nehemiah 13:28, Nehemiah discovers that one of the grandsons of the current high priest, Eliashib, had married a daughter of Sanballat and was thus son-in-law of his chief enemy. Nehemiah also finds out that Eliashib had leased the Temple's storerooms to Tobiah, depriving the Levites of their tithes. Eliashib is driven out of Jerusalem for defiling the priesthood.

=== Book of Zechariah ===
It has been speculated that the business dealings of Sanballat with the descendants of Joshua the High Priest, in particular with Jeshua's grandson, the high priest Eliashib, and with Jeshua's great-grandson who had betrothed his son to a daughter of Sanballat, may form part of the context for the "vision" of Joshua the High Priest in a heavenly tribunal between the angel of the Lord and a satanic figure in Zechariah 3. This connection between priestly intermarriage with the Samaritans and Sanballat's family in Nehemiah 13:28 to the "dirty clothes" of Joshua in Zechariah 3 was first asserted in the 4th century AD by Rav Pappa and in Christian circles by Jerome. It is also noted by medieval Jewish commentators David Kimhi, Rashi, and Moses ibn Ezra, though ibn Ezra after considering the connection rejects it.

== Josephus ==
Josephus (Antiquities xi. 7, § 2.), writing 600 years after the fact, claims to describe the construction of the Temple on Gerizim and says it was modeled on the Temple in Jerusalem. He also relates that many Israelites who married Samaritans moved to Samaria, causing much bewilderment in Jerusalem. places Sanballat later on in Persian history, during the reign of Darius III in the 4th century BCE. He likely confused this Sanballat with one of his successors, possibly Sanballat II or Sanballat III. Josephus's story is probably a traditional account of the origin of the Samaritan Temple on Mount Gerizim. Josephus records the marriage of Manasseh, grandson of Eliashib, to Sanballat's daughter in Nehemiah 13:28 as having taken place and causing the founding of the temple.

== Elephantine papyri ==
In the Elephantine papyri and ostraca, CAP 30, Sanballat is said to have had two sons, Delaiah bar Sanballat and Shelemiah bar Sanballat. The Jews of Elephantine ask Sanballat's sons for help rebuilding the Temple at Elephantine, which had been damaged or destroyed by rioters.

== Modern research ==
According to Yitzakh Magen (2007), Sanballat appears to have been the scion of a veteran Samaritan family of the Israelite remnant originating in Horon, perhaps to be identified with the village of Huwara at the foot of Mount Gerizim. In Magen's reconstruction, Sanballat was commander of a garrison force who rose to be appointed governor of Samaria, the first of the Israelites to achieve this rank, sometime before Nehemiah's return from exile and arrival in Judea in 444 BCE. He thought a sacred site was necessary to unite Samaria and its populations. The Levite priesthood had migrated to Judea, and the priests of Baal were idolatrous. He chose from tradition Mount Gerizim, over whose site he chose a high priest from a noble family in Jerusalem, a grandson of Eliashib, (Note: Josephus says Sanballat's daughter was named Nikaso, married to a Jerusalem high priest, Manasseh, the brother of the high priest Jehoiada.) to preside, and to whom he gave his daughter in marriage. He established a temple to Yahweh on Mount Gerizim, over which his own descendants, born into priestly blood, could minister.

== See also ==
- List of biblical figures identified in extra-biblical sources
