= Sanballat II =

Hypothesized governor of Samaria

Sanballat II is hypothesized to be a hereditary governor of Samaria under the Achaemenid Empire. If he existed, he reigned during the early and mid fourth century BCE. He is hypothesized to be a grandson of Sanballat the Horonite, who is mentioned in the Book of Nehemiah and the Elephantine papyri. The regnal number of "II" is a modern convention, and he would not have been called that at the time.

The hypothesized time period where Sanballat II was governor may have coincided with the construction of the Samaritan Temple on Mount Gerizim.

== Samaria papyri ==
Frank Moore Cross was involved in the purchase and excavation of ancient papyri at Wadi Daliyeh, preserved by the dry climate. A Sanballat is indeed referred to in these papyri, but the time period seemed to be somewhat later than the period described in the Book of Nehemiah. As a result, Cross came to the conclusion that at least three different Sanballats ruled as governor of Samaria during the Persian era, and that the governorship had passed down a family line. He believed that the order went Sanballat the Horonite (5th century BCE); Delaiah, son of Sanballat; Sanballat II; Hananiah, son of Sanballat II; Sanballat III. For Cross, the first Sanballat is the person described in the Book of Nehemiah; the second Sanballat was who was in the Wadi Daliyeh papyri; and the third Sanballat is the subject of the story in Josephus's Jewish Antiquities book 11 that takes place around the time of Alexander the Great's invasion of the Persian Empire.

However, the matter is not settled. There has been opposition that Sanballat II may not have existed.
