= Bagoas (disambiguation) =

Bagoas or Bageus was a title or honorific in Ancient Persia denoting a eunuch who acted as a sort of viceroy for the king. According to 1st-century Roman author Pliny the Elder, "Bagoas" merely meant "eunuch", but modern scholars note that every Bagoas mentioned throughout history (who was a real and not fictional person) wielded considerable power and influence, generally on the behalf of some ruler.

There are numerous persons described in ancient sources as being named "Bagoas":

== Historical figures ==
- Bagoas the Persian, 5th-century governor of the Achaemenid province of Yehud, known from the Elephantine papyri
- Bagoas, in charge of the affairs of Holofernes in the Book of Judith
- Bageus, dispatched in 404 BC by Persian statesman Pharnabazus II to assassinate Alcibiades
- Bagoas (died 336 BC) was a Persian minister of Artaxerxes III
- Bagoas (courtier), a favorite of Alexander the Great
- Bagoas, a minor figure in the Mithridatic Wars who in 90 BCE drove out Ariobarzanes I of Cappadocia
- Bagoas, eunuch of Herod the Great, executed in the 1st century BCE for conspiring against his king
- Bagous, a bedchamber attendant in the poem Amores by Ovid
- Bagoas, the fictional main character of The Eunuch, a parable by the 2nd century writer Lucian
- Bagoas, character in the novel Aethiopica, by 3rd-century writer Heliodorus of Emesa

== Other ==
- Abrial A-12 Bagoas, a French experimental glider of the 1930s

== See also ==
- Bagous, a genus of beetle
