= Hananiah (Samaritan) =

Governor of Samaria (c. 354 BCE)

Hananiah ben Sanballat was a governor of Samaria under the Achaemenid Empire in the mid fourth century BCE.

The scholar Frank Moore Cross was involved in the purchase and excavation of ancient papyri at Wadi Daliyeh, preserved by the dry climate. One of the papyri fragments he found included the line "before Hananiah governor of Samaria." Cross dated the line to around 354 BCE, and took it as evidence that someone named Hananiah was governor then, and was possibly the same person as "Hanan the prefect." He also hypothesized that the governorship of Samaria was hereditary, and that Hananiah was the son of "Sanballat II", a hypothesized other Sanballat. Cross's reconstruction has not been universally accepted, however.
