= Book of Nehemiah =

Book of the Bible

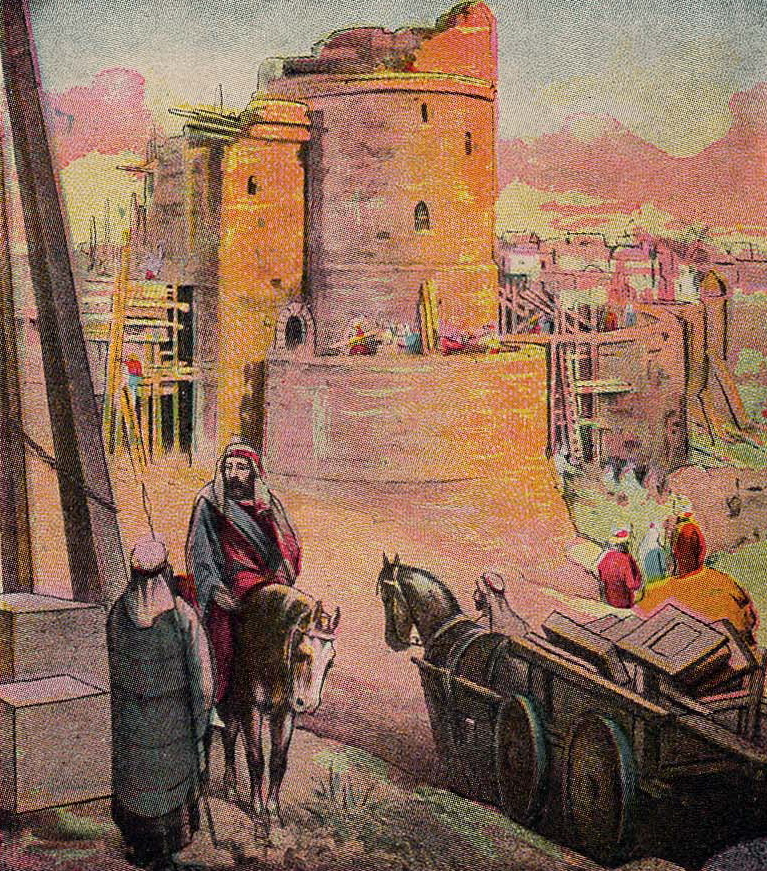
Building the Wall of Jerusalem

The Book of Nehemiah in the Hebrew Bible largely takes the form of a first-person memoir by Nehemiah, a Hebrew prophet and high official at the Persian court. It concerns the rebuilding of the walls of Jerusalem after the Babylonian exile, and the dedication of the city and its people to God's laws (Torah).

Since the 16th century, Nehemiah has generally been treated as a separate book within the Bible. Before then, it had been combined with the Book of Ezra; but in Latin Christian Bibles from the 13th century onwards, the Vulgate's Book of Ezra was divided into two texts called the First and Second Books of Ezra, respectively. This separation became canonised with the first printed Bibles in Hebrew and Latin. Mid-16th century Reformed Protestant Bible translations produced in Geneva, such as the Geneva Bible, were the first to introduce the title "Book of Nehemiah" for the text formerly called the "Second Book of Ezra".

The historicity of Nehemiah, his objectives, and the "Nehemiah memoir" have recently become very controversial in biblical scholarship, with maximalists viewing it as a historical account and minimalists doubting whether Nehemiah existed.

== Summary ==
The events take place in the second half of the 5th century BC. Listed together with the Book of Ezra as Ezra–Nehemiah, it represents the final chapter in the historical narrative of the Hebrew Bible.

The original core of the book, the first-person memoir, may have been combined with the core of the Book of Ezra around 400 BC. Further editing probably continued into the Hellenistic era.

The book tells how Nehemiah, at the court of the king in Susa, is informed that Jerusalem is without walls, and resolves to restore them. The king appoints him as governor of Judah and he travels to Jerusalem. There he rebuilds the walls, despite the opposition of Israel's enemies, and reforms the community in conformity with the law of Moses. After 12 years in Jerusalem, he returns to Susa but subsequently revisits Jerusalem. He finds that the Israelites have been backsliding and taking non-Hebrew wives, and he stays in Jerusalem to enforce the Law.

Chapters

1. In the 20th year of Artaxerxes I of Persia, Nehemiah, cup-bearer to the king in Susa (the Persian capital), learns that the wall of Jerusalem is destroyed. He prays to God, confessing the sins of Israel, then reminding God of His promise to restore the Promised Land. He asks God for success in asking King Artaxerxes for permission to return to Jerusalem to rebuild its wall.
2. While Nehemiah is serving wine the king notices his sadness. Nehemiah humbly confesses it is because the city of his ancestors is in ruins and asks permission to rebuild the city wall. The king agrees. Nehemiah then asks for letters of safe-conduct and for permission to obtain timber from the royal forest. The king agrees to these requests and additionally dispatches a military escort to accompany Nehemiah to Jerusalem. When Nehemiah arrives he secretly inspects the wall before encouraging the local leaders to join him in rebuilding. However, when Sanballat of Samaria, Tobiah the Ammonite, and Geshem the Arab hear about it they mock the Israelites and accuse them of rebelling against the king.
3. The families and leaders of Jerusalem each take a gate or a section of wall and begin rebuilding.
4. The leaders of the opposing tribes – Sanballat the Horonite, Tobiah the Ammonite, Geshem the Arab, and the men of Ashdod – plot together to attack Jerusalem, which forces the Hebrews rebuilding the wall to work with weapons in their hands.
5. Nehemiah, having seen the Hebrew nobles oppressing the poor, orders the cancellation of all debt and mortgages; previous governors have been corrupt and oppressive, but he has been righteous and just.
6. Sanballat accuses Nehemiah of planning rebellion against Artaxerxes, and Nehemiah is opposed even by Hebrew nobles and prophets, but the wall is completed.
7. Nehemiah appoints officials and sets guards on the wall and gates; he plans to register the Hebrews, and finds the census of those who had returned earlier.
8. Nehemiah assembles the people and has Ezra read to them the law-book of Moses; Nehemiah, Ezra and the Levites institute the Feast of Booths, in accordance with the Law.
9. The Hebrews assemble in penance and prayer, recalling their past sins, God's help to them, and his promise of the land.
10. The priests, Levites and the Israelite people enter into a covenant, agreeing to separate themselves from the surrounding peoples and to keep the Law.
11. Jerusalem is repopulated by the Hebrews living in the towns and villages of Judah and Benjamin.
12. A list of priests and Levites who returned in the days of Cyrus (the first returnees from Babylon) is presented; Nehemiah, aided by Ezra, oversees the dedication of the walls and the rebuilt city.
13. After 12 years Nehemiah returns to Susa; he later comes back to Jerusalem, and finds that there has been backsliding in his absence. He takes measures to enforce his earlier reforms and asks for God's favour.

== Historical background ==
The book is set in the 5th century BC. Judah is one of several provinces within a larger satrapy (a large administrative unit) within the Achaemenid Empire. The capital of the empire is at Susa. Nehemiah is a cup-bearer to king Artaxerxes I of Persia – an important official position.

At his own request Nehemiah is sent to Jerusalem as governor of Yehud, the official Persian name for Judah. Jerusalem had been conquered and destroyed by the Babylonians in 586 BC and Nehemiah finds it still in ruins. His task is to rebuild the walls and to re-populate the city. He faces opposition from three powerful neighbours, the Samaritans, the Ammonites, and the Arabs, as well as the city of Ashdod, but manages to rebuild the walls. He then purifies the Hebrew community by enforcing its segregation from its neighbours and enforces the laws of Moses.

== Textual history ==
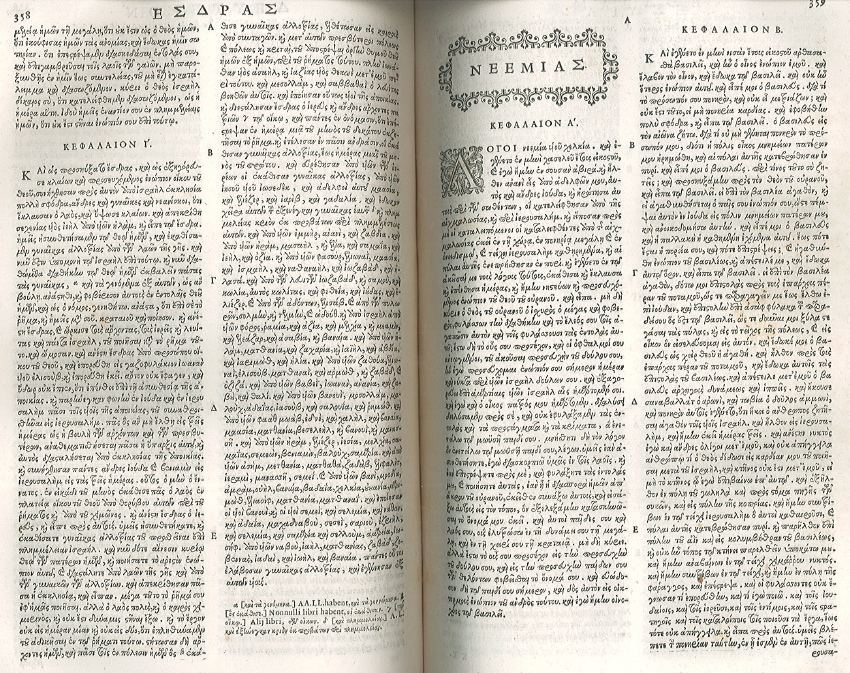
Septuagint version of Nehemiah

The single Hebrew book Ezra–Nehemiah, with title "Ezra", was translated into Greek around the middle of the 2nd century BC. Slightly later a second, and very different Greek translation was made, in the form of 1 Esdras, from which the deeds of Nehemiah are entirely absent, those sections either being omitted or re-attributed to Ezra instead; and initially early Christians reckoned this later translation as their biblical 'Book of Ezra', as had the 1st century Jewish writer Josephus. From the third century the Christian Old Testament in Greek supplemented the text of 1 Esdras with the older translation of Ezra–Nehemiah, naming the two books Esdras A and Esdras B respectively; and this usage is noted by the 3rd century Christian scholar Origen, who remarked that the Hebrew 'book of Ezra' might then be considered a 'double' book. Jerome, writing in the early 5th century, noted that this duplication had since been adopted by Greek and Latin Christians. Jerome himself rejected the duplication in his Vulgate translation of the Bible into Latin from the Hebrew; and consequently all early Vulgate manuscripts present Ezra–Nehemiah as a single book, as too does the 8th century commentary of Bede, and the 9th century bibles of Alcuin and Theodulf of Orleans. However, sporadically from the 9th century onwards, Latin bibles are found that separate the Ezra and Nehemiah sections of Ezra–Nehemiah as two distinct books, then called the first and second books of Ezra; and this becomes standard in the Paris Bibles of the 13th century. It was not until 1516/17, in the first printed Rabbinic Bible of Daniel Bomberg that the separation was introduced generally in Hebrew Bibles.

In later medieval Christian commentary, this book is referred to as the 'second book of Ezra', and never as the 'Book of Nehemiah"; equally citations from this book are always introduced as "Ezra says...", and never as 'Nehemiah says...".

== Composition and date ==
The combined book Ezra–Nehemiah of the earliest Christian and Hebrew period was known as Ezra and was probably attributed to Ezra himself; according to a rabbinic tradition, however, Nehemiah was the real author but was forbidden to claim authorship because of his bad habit of disparaging others.

The Nehemiah Memorial, chapters 1–7 and 11–13, may have circulated as an independent work before being combined with the Ezra material to form Ezra–Nehemiah. Determining the composition of the Memorial depends on the dates of Nehemiah's mission: It is commonly accepted that "Artaxerxes" was Artaxerxes I (there were two later kings of the same name), and that Nehemiah's first period in Jerusalem was therefore 445–433 BC; allowing for his return to Susa and second journey to Jerusalem, the end of the 5th century BC is therefore the earliest possible date for the Memorial. The Nehemiah Memorial is interrupted by chapters 8–10, which concern Ezra. These have sometimes been identified as another, separate work, the Ezra Memorial (EM), but other scholars believe the EM to be fictional and heavily altered by later editors. Both the Nehemiah and Ezra material are combined with numerous lists, Censuses and other material.

The first edition of the combined Ezra–Nehemiah may date from the early 4th century BC; further editing continued well into the following centuries.

== See also ==
- Esdras
- Ezra–Nehemiah
- Magnifica humanitas - Pope Leo XIV references the rebuilding of Jerusalem in the Book of Nehemiah as one of the two biblical images for the direction of artificial intelligence
