= Geshem the Arabian =

Biblical figure (Book of Nehemiah)

Geshem the Arabian or Geshem the Arab (Biblical Hebrew: גֶשֶׁם הָעַרְבִי, romanized: Gešem hāʿArḇî) is an Arab man mentioned in the Hebrew Bible. He was an ally of Sanballat and Tobiah and adversary of Nehemiah in Nehemiah 2:19 and 6:1). In 6:6, he is called "Gashmu," which is probably more correct, as an Arab tribe named "Gushamu" is known (Cook, "Aramaic Glossary," s.v. ^{גשמו}). When Nehemiah proceeded to rebuild the walls of Jerusalem, the Samaritans, and the Arabs made efforts to hinder him. Geshem or Gashmu, probably the chief of the Arabs, joined the Samaritans and accused Nehemiah of conspiracy against the Achaemenid emperor.

== Identification ==
Three sources possibly refer to the Geshem who opposed Nehemiah. A 5th-century B.C. Aramaic inscription from Egypt refers to "Qaunu, the son Gashmu, the king of Kedar." The Qedarites were one of the leading Arab groups in this period. Moreover, a contemporary account and a king list from Dedan mention Gashmu. If Nehemiah's "Geshem the Arab" were a Qedarite king, his influence would have stretched from northern Arabia to include the Kingdom of Judah.
