= Yehud (Persian province) =

Province of the Achaemenid Empire

Province of Judah Yêhūd Mêdīnāta (Aramaic)
- c. 539 BCE–c. 332 BCE
- Standard of Cyrus the Great

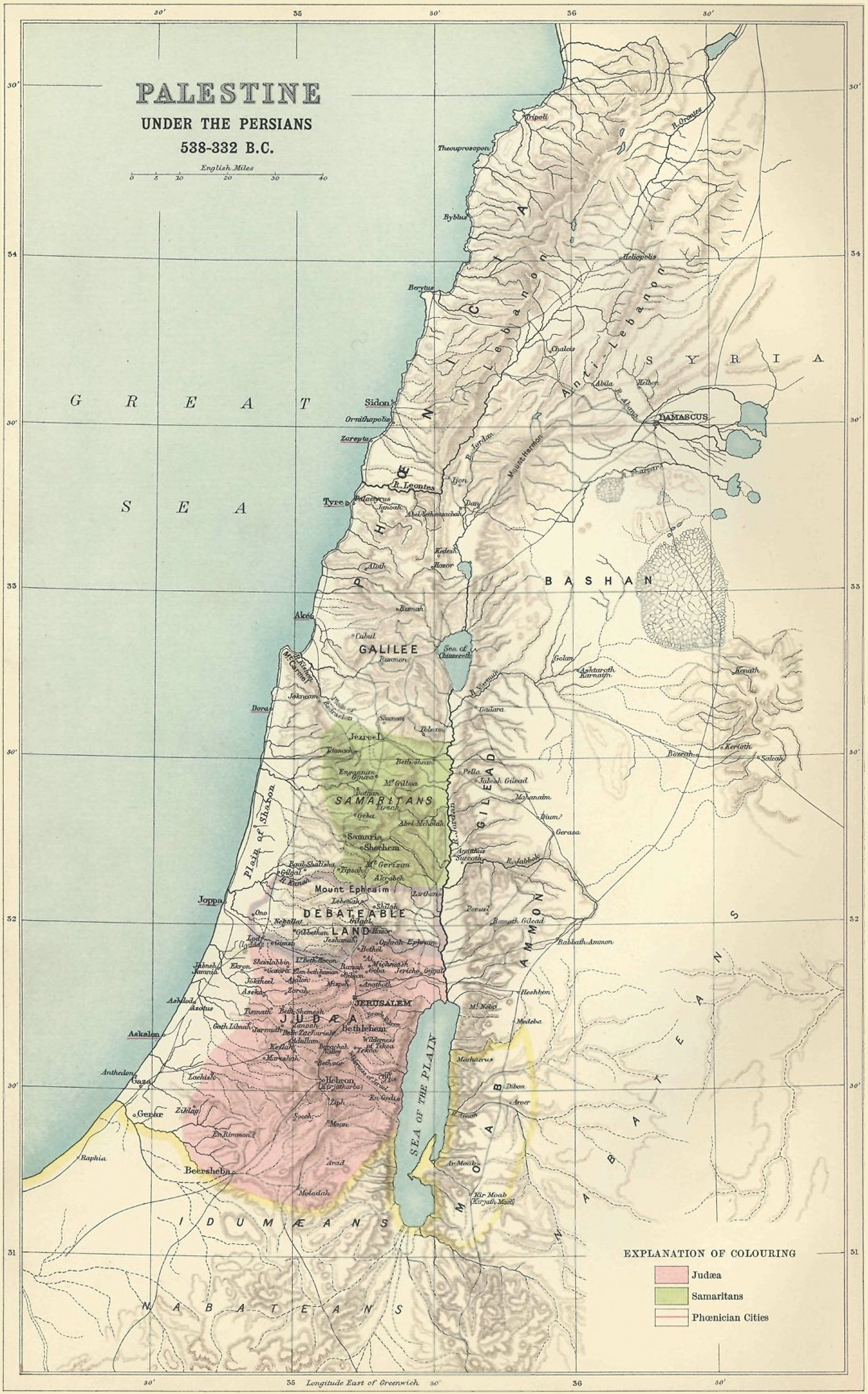
- Southern Levant under the Persians (George Adam Smith, 1915): Jews (Judea); Samaritans (Samaria)
- Capital: Jerusalem
- Demonym: Jewish, Judean, Judahite or Israelite
- Area
  - Coordinates: 31°47′N 35°13′E
- Historical era: Axial Age
  - Battle of Opis: c. 539 BCE
  - Persian conquest of Babylon: 539 BCE
  - Edict of Cyrus ends Babylonian captivity: 538 BCE
  - Return to Zion: 538 BCE
  - Construction of the Second Jewish Temple in Jerusalem: 520–515 BCE
  - Greek conquest of Persia: c. 332 BCE
Preceded by	Succeeded by
Babylonian Yehud	Hellenistic Palestine
- Today part of: Israel; Palestine

Yehud or Yehud Medinta (Biblical Aramaic: יְהוּד מְדִינְתָּא, Yəhūḏ Məḏīntā, "the province of Judah"), sometimes misread as Yehud Medinata, (Note: In which the Aramaic is misparsed as a plural.) was an autonomous province of the Achaemenid Empire. The name is originally Aramaic and was first introduced after Judah fell to the Babylonians. Located in Judea, the territory was ethnically diverse with a distinct Jewish community whose High Priest of Israel emerged as a central religious and political leader. It lasted for just over two centuries before being incorporated into the Hellenistic empires, which emerged following the Greek conquest of the Persian Empire.

Upon the Persian conquest of Babylon in 539 BCE, the Achaemenid Empire established its own Yehud province to absorb the Babylonian province of Yehud, which, in turn, had been established by the Neo-Babylonian Empire to absorb the Kingdom of Judah upon the Babylonian conquest of Jerusalem in 587 BCE. Around this time, the Persian king Cyrus the Great issued what is commonly known as the Edict of Cyrus, which is described in the Hebrew Bible as a royal proclamation that ended the Babylonian captivity and initiated the return to Zion. In the new province, repatriated Jews began to revive their national identity and reconstruct the Temple in Jerusalem.

The province constituted a part of Eber-Nari and was bounded by Idumaea (now part of Achaemenid Arabia) to the south, lying along the frontier of the two districts. Spanning most of Judea—from the Shephelah in the west to the Dead Sea in the east—it was one of several Persian provinces in the Levant, together with Moab, Ammon, Gilead, Samaria, Ashdod, and Idumaea/Arabia, among others. The province's overall population is gauged as having been considerably smaller than that of the fallen Israelite kingdom.

In Jewish history, the Persian period marks the start of the Second Temple period. Governor Zerubbabel, who led the first Jewish returnees, laid the foundation of the Second Temple. Other Jewish leaders followed, such as Ezra and Nehemiah, and their efforts to rebuild Jewish life in the region are chronicled in biblical books named after them. Another significant Persian-period achievement was the canonization of the Torah, traditionally credited to Ezra and playing an important role in shaping the Jewish identity.

== Background ==
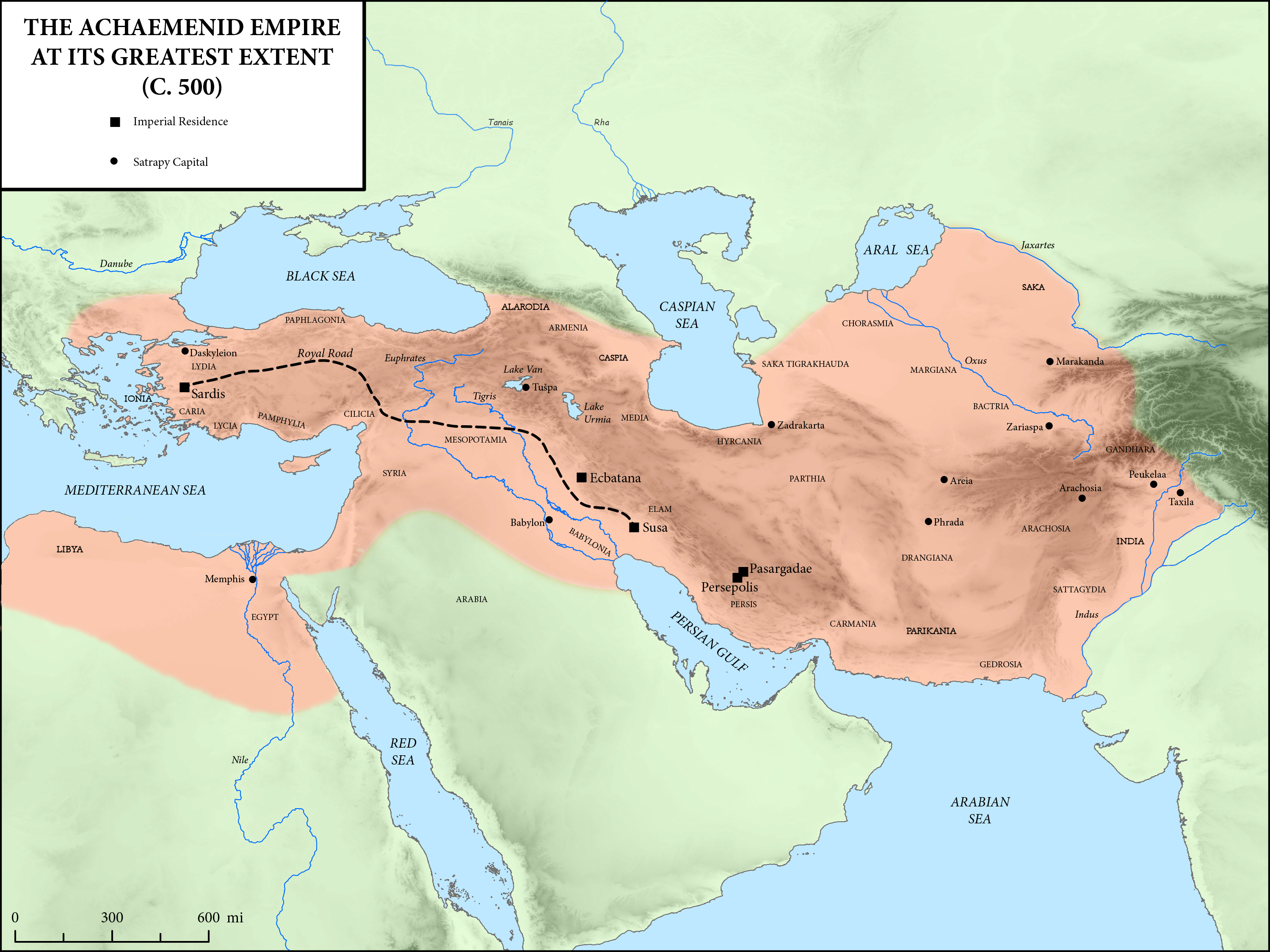
The Achaemenid Empire at its greatest extent, including the province of Yehud.

=== Kingdom of Judah v. Neo-Babylonian Empire ===
In the late 7th century BCE, Judah became a vassal state of the Neo-Babylonian Empire. There were rival factions at the court in Jerusalem, some supporting loyalty to Babylon and others urging rebellion. In the early years of the 6th century BCE, despite the strong remonstrances of the prophet Jeremiah and others, the Judahite king Jehoiakim revolted against Nebuchadnezzar II. The revolt failed, and in 597 BCE, many Judahites, including the prophet Ezekiel, were exiled to Babylon. A few years later, Judah revolted yet again. In 589, Nebuchadnezzar again besieged Jerusalem, and many Jews fled to Moab, Ammon, Edom, and other countries to seek refuge. The city fell after an 18-month siege, and Nebuchadnezzar again pillaged and destroyed Jerusalem and burned the Temple in Jerusalem. Thus, by 586 BCE, much of Judah was devastated; the royal family, the priesthood, and the scribes, the country's elite, were in exile in Babylon, and the former kingdom suffered a steep decline in economy and population.

==== Jewish exile to Babylon ====
The numbers of those who were deported to Babylon or made their way to Egypt and the remnants that remained in Yehud Province and surrounding countries are subject to academic debate. The Book of Jeremiah reports that a total of 4,600 were exiled to Babylon. To such numbers must be added those deported by Nebuchadnezzar in 597 BCE after the first siege to Jerusalem, when he deported the king of Judah, Jeconiah. His court, other prominent citizens, craftsmen, and a sizable portion of the Jewish population of Judah, numbering about 10,000. The Book of Kings also suggests 8,000.

==== Babylonian province of Judah ====
The former kingdom of Judah then became the Babylonian province Yehud, with Gedaliah, a native Judahite, as governor (or possibly ruling as a puppet king). According to Miller and Hayes, the province included the towns of Bethel in the north, Mizpah, Jericho in the east, Jerusalem, Beth-Zur in the west and En-Gedi in the south. The administrative centre of the province was Mizpah. On hearing of the appointment, the Jews who had taken refuge in surrounding countries returned to Judah. However, before long, Gedaliah was assassinated by a member of the former royal house, and the Babylonian garrison was killed, triggering a mass movement of refugees to Egypt. In Egypt, the refugees settled in Migdol, Tahpanhes, Noph, and Pathros, and Jeremiah went with them as moral guardian.

=== Neo-Babylonian Empire v. Achaemenid Empire ===
The Babylonians deported many Judeans and Jerusalem was left in ruins; a small but far from negligible population of Judeans continued to live in their native land during this period. Despite biblical descriptions of Jerusalem as a large walled city, archaeological evidence of Persian-period Jerusalem indicates it was a small, unfortified village covering an area of about 2 to 2.5 hectares in the City of David. Estimates for the population of Persian-period Jerusalem range between a few hundred to high estimates of 1,500-3,000 inhabitants. The low demographic estimates anchored in the archaeological evidence that reveal only small Persian period remains challenge traditional ideas about a massive return of exiles, as well as the dating and authorship of biblical texts.

==== Jewish return to Zion ====
The Edict of Cyrus, issued by the Achaemenid emperor, Cyrus the Great, shortly after the fall of Babylon, was the Persian King’s royal proclamation by which he ended the Babylonian captivity of the Jews. In the Hebrew Bible, this decree is accredited as having enabled the exiled Israelites’ return to Zion—an event in which the captive populace of Judah returned to their ancestral homeland in Judea, restructured as a self-governing Jewish province within the Achaemenid Empire. To replace Solomon's Temple, work began on the Second Temple after the region was conquered by the Persians. By the late sixth century BC, the temple in Jerusalem had been restored, and its body of worship, practice, and sacrificial offerings had been re-established.

==== Persian province of Judah ====
Much of the literature which became the Hebrew Bible was compiled in the early post-Exilic period, and Persian Yehud saw considerable conflict over the construction and function of the Temple and matters of cult (i.e., how God was to be worshiped). Persia controlled Yehud using the same methods it used in other territories; Yehud's status as a Persian holding is crucial to understanding the society and literature of the period. The returnees from the exile community attempted to restore in Yehud the pre-Exile tripartite leadership template of king (Sheshbazzar and Zerubbabel), the high priest (Joshua, descended from the priestly line), and prophet (Haggai, Zechariah). However, by the middle of the next century, probably around 450 BCE, the kings and prophets had disappeared and only the high priest remained, joined by the scribe-sage (Ezra) and the appointed aristocrat-governor (Nehemiah). This new pattern provided the leadership model for Yehud for centuries to come.

== History ==
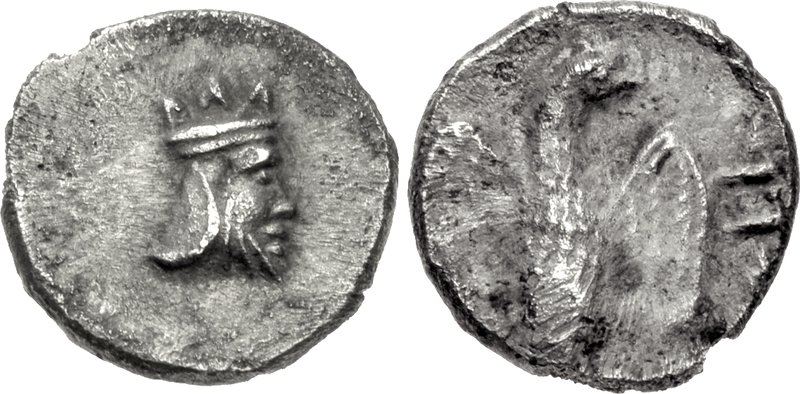
Silver coin (gerah) minted in the Persian province of Yehud, dated c. 375–332 BCE. Obv: Bearded head wearing crown, possibly representing the Persian Great King. Rev: Falcon facing, head right, with wings spread; Paleo-Hebrew YHD to right.

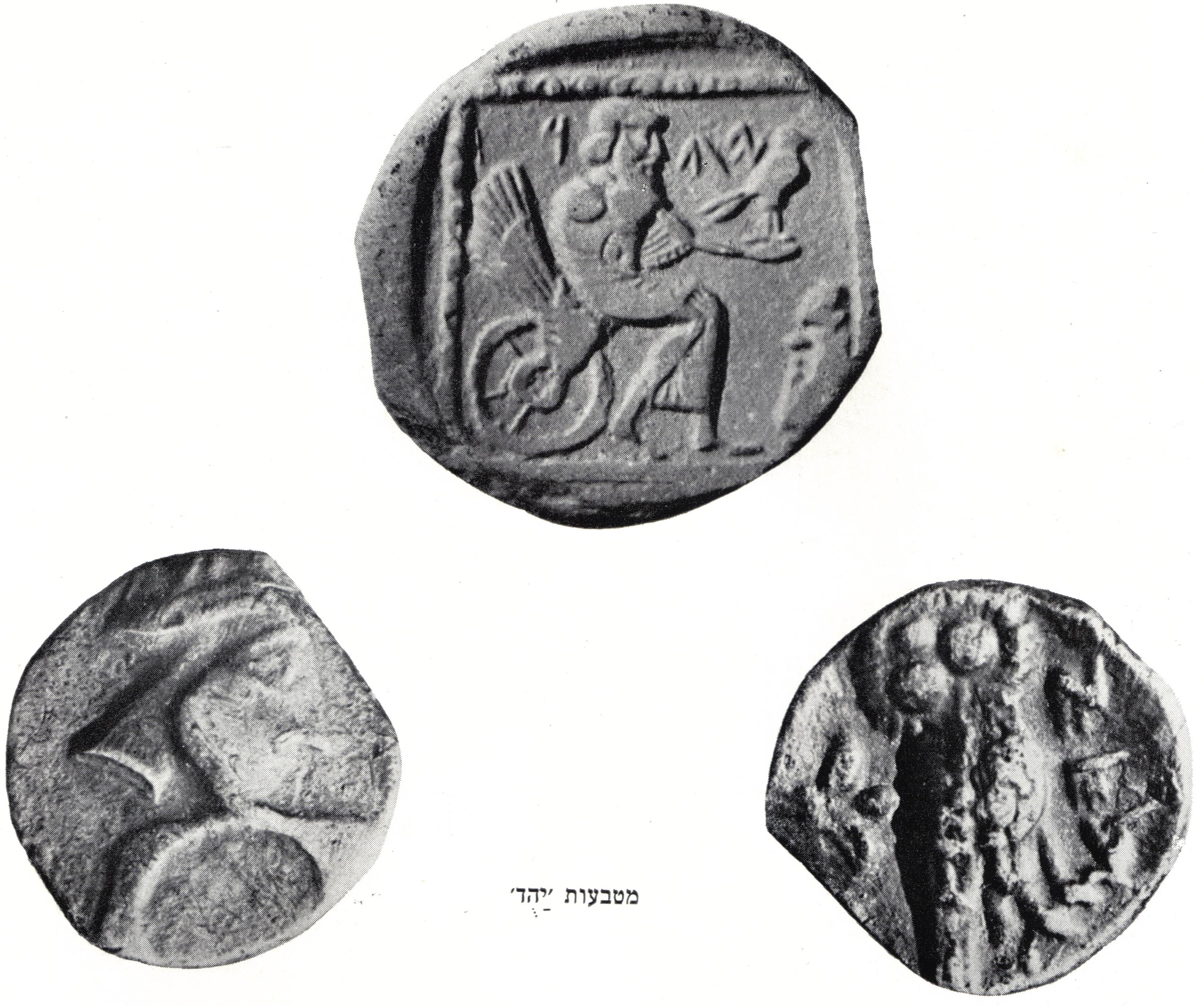
Coins attributed to the region. The God on the Winged Wheel coin (top) may show the god Yahweh. The coin at bottom right has an image of the owl of Athena (Athenian coinage was the standard for Mediterranean trade).

=== Administration and demographics ===
Yehud was one of twenty provinces or administrative subunits in the large satrapy of Eber-nari, along with Idumea, Samerina (Samaria), Moab, Ammon, Gilead, Ashdod and Gaza, among others. It was smaller than the former Iron-Age kingdom of Judah, stretching from around Bethel in the north to near Hebron in the south, which at the time belonged to Idumaea, and from the Jordan River and the Dead Sea in the east to, but not including, the Shephelah, the slopes between the Judean highlands and the coastal plains in the west. After the destruction of Jerusalem the centre of gravity shifted northward to Benjamin; this region, once a part of the kingdom of Israel, was far more densely populated than Judah itself, and now held both the administrative capital, Mizpah, and the major religious centre of Bethel. Mizpah continued as the provincial capital for over a century. The position of Jerusalem before the administration moved back from Mizpah is unclear. From 445 BCE onwards, it was once more the main city of Yehud, with walls, the Temple, and other facilities needed to function as a provincial capital, including, from 420 BCE, a local mint striking silver coins. Nevertheless, Persian-era Jerusalem was modest: about 1,500 inhabitants. It was the only true urban site in Yehud, as the bulk of the province's population lived in small unwalled villages. This picture did not much change throughout the entire Persian period. The entire population of the province remained around 30,000. There is no sign in the archaeological record of massive inwards migration from Babylon, in contradiction to the biblical account where Zerubbabel's band of returning Israelite exiles alone numbered 42,360.

The Persians seem to have experimented with ruling Yehud as a vassal kingdom, but this time under the descendants of Jehoiachin, who had kept his royal status even in captivity. Sheshbazzar, the governor of Yehud appointed by Cyrus in 538, was of Davidic origin, as was his successor (and nephew) Zerubbabel; Zerubbabel in turn was succeeded by his second son and then by his son-in-law, all of them hereditary Davidic governors of Yehud, a state of affairs that ended only around 500 BCE. This hypothesis—that Zerubbabel and his immediate successors represented a restoration of the Davidic kingdom under Persian overlordship—cannot be verified, but it would be in keeping with the situation in some other parts of the Persian Empire, such as Phoenicia.

The second and third pillars of the early period of Persian rule in Yehud, copying the pattern of the old Davidic kingdom destroyed by the Babylonians, were the institutions of High Priest and Prophet. Both are described and preserved in the Hebrew Bible in the histories of Ezra–Nehemiah–Chronicles and in the books of Zechariah, Haggai and Malachi, but by the mid-5th century BCE the prophets and Davidic kings had disappeared, leaving only the High Priest. The practical result was that after c.500 BCE Yehud became a theocracy, ruled by a line of hereditary High Priests.

The governor of Yehud would have been charged primarily with keeping order and seeing that tribute was paid. He would have been assisted by various officials and a body of scribes, but there is no evidence that a popular "assembly" existed, and he would have had little discretion over his core duties. Evidence from seals and coins suggests that most, if not all, of the governors of Persian Yehud were Jewish, a situation which conforms with the general Persian practice of governing through local leaders.

==== Governors ====
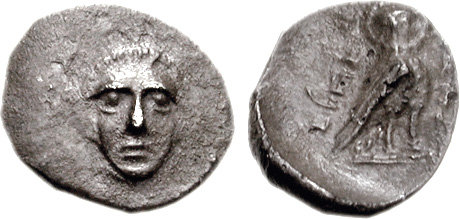
Coin identified as minted in Yehud reading, "Hezekiah pehah" (pehah = governor), Achaemenid period. Circa 375–333 BCE.

The succession order and dates of most of the governors of the Achaemenid province of Yehud cannot be recreated with any degree of certainty. Coins, jar-stamp impressions, and seals from the period provide the names of Elnathan, Hananiah (?), Jehoezer, Ahzai and Urio, all of them Jewish names. Some of them must have served between Zerubbabel and Nehemiah. Bagoas the Persian (Bagohi or Bagoi in Persian) is known by this short form of several theophoric names that was often used for eunuchs. He is mentioned in the 5th-century Elephantine papyri, and must therefore have served after Nehemiah.

- Sheshbazzar (either identical with, or governor before, Zerubbabel)
- Zerubbabel (second half of the sixth century BCE). Led the first wave of Jewish exiles back to Judea after the fall of the Neo-Babylonian Empire to Cyrus the Great. His family, however, remained behind in Nehardea.
- Ezra ben Seraiah (mid-fifth or early fourth century BCE, depending on whether Artaxerxes I or II was king in his time), the subject of the Hebrew Bible's Book of Ezra.
- Nehemiah ben Hachaliah (second half of the fifth century BCE), the subject of the Hebrew Bible's Book of Nehemiah.
- Hezekiah or Yehezqiyah, identified as hphh, 'ha-pechah' (the governor), by the script on a coin type dated to the late fourth century, possibly around 335 BCE, one of which was found at Beth Zur The inscription is also rendered in English as "the governor Hezekiah".

=== Community and religion ===
There is a consensus among biblical scholars that ancient Judah during the 9th and 8th centuries BCE was basically henotheistic or monolatrous, with Yahweh as a national god in the same way that surrounding nations each had their national gods. Monotheistic themes arose as early as the 8th century, in opposition to Assyrian royal propaganda, which depicted the Assyrian king as "Lord of the Four Quarters" (the world), but the Exile broke the competing fertility, ancestor and other cults and allowed it to emerge as the dominant theology of Yehud. The minor gods or "sons of God" of the old pantheon now turned into a hierarchy of angels and demons in a process that continued to evolve throughout the time of Yehud and into the Hellenistic age.

Zoroastrianism influenced the Judahite religion and, subsequently, Judaism. Although the exact extent of that influence continues to be debated, a shared concept of God as creator, the one who guarantees justice, and the god of heaven. The experience of exile and restoration itself brought about a new worldview in which Jerusalem and the House of David continued to be central ingredients, and the destruction of the Temple came to be regarded as a demonstration of Yahweh's strength.

Possibly the single most important development in the post-Exilic period was the promotion and eventual dominance of the idea and practice of Jewish exclusivity, the idea that the Jews (meaning descendants of Jacob, followers of the God of Israel and the law of Moses) were or should be an ethnic group apart from all others. According to Levine, that was a new idea originating from the party of the golah, those who returned from the Babylonian exile. Despite Ezra's and Nehemiah's intolerance of gentiles and Samaritans, Jewish relations with the Samaritans and other neighbours were otherwise close and cordial. Comparison of Ezra-Nehemiah and Chronicles bears this out: Chronicles opens participation in Yahweh-worship to all twelve tribes and even to foreigners, but for Ezra-Nehemiah, "Israel" means the tribes of Judah and Benjamin alone as well as the holy tribe of Levi.

Despite Yehud being consistently monotheistic, some pockets of polytheistic Yahwism still appeared to exist in the Persian period: the Elephantine papyri and ostraca (usually dated to the 5th century BCE) shows that a small community of Jews living on the Egyptian island of Elephantine, while being devout supporters of Yahweh, also venerated the Egyptian goddess Anat and even had their temple on the island. This community had probably been founded before the Babylonian exile and had, therefore, remained cut off from religious reforms on the mainland. While it appears that the Elephantine community had some contact with the Second Temple (as evidenced by the fact that they had written a letter to the High Priest Johanan of Jerusalem), the exact relationship between the two is currently unclear. Following the expulsion of the Persians from Egypt by Pharaoh Amyrtaeus (404 BCE), the Jewish temple in Elephantine was abandoned.

=== Language and literature ===
Scholars believe that in the Persian period, the Torah assumed its final form, the history of ancient Israel and Judah contained in the books from Joshua to Kings was revised and completed and the older prophetic books were redacted. New writing included the interpretation of older works, such as the Book of Chronicles, and genuinely original work including Ben Sira, Tobit, Judith, 1 Enoch and, much later, Maccabees. The literature from Ben Sira onwards is increasingly permeated with references to the Hebrew Bible in the present form, suggesting the slow development of the idea of a body of "scripture" in the sense of authoritative writings.

One of the more important cultural shifts in the Persian period was the rise of Imperial Aramaic as the predominant language of Yehud and the Jewish diaspora. Originally spoken by Aramaeans, the Persians adopted it and became the lingua franca of the empire, and already in the time of Ezra, it was necessary to have the Torah readings translated into Aramaic for them to be understood by Jews.

Only a small amount of Hebrew-written epigraphic material from the Persian period has survived, including some coins from Tell Jemmeh and Beth-zur using the Paleo-Hebrew script, two seal impressions on bullae from a cave in Wadi Daliyeh, a seal from Tel Michal, etc. In contrast, Aramaic-written epigraphic material is much more prevalent.

== Biblical narrative ==
In 539 BCE, Babylon fell to the Achaemenids. That event is dated securely from non-biblical sources. In his first year (538 BCE), Cyrus the Great decreed that the deportees in Babylon could return to Yehud and rebuild the Temple. Led by Zerubbabel, 42,360 exiles returned to Yehud, where he and Joshua the High Priest, although they were in fear of the "people of the land", re-instituted sacrifices.

According to Book of Ezra, Jeshua and Zerubbabel were frustrated in their efforts to rebuild the Temple by the enmity of the "people of the land" and the opposition of the governor of "Beyond-the-River" (the satrapy of which Yehud was a smaller unit). (Ezra 3–4:4) However, in the second year of Darius (520 BCE), Darius discovered the Decree of Cyrus in the archives. He directed the satrap to support the work, which he did, and the Temple was completed in the sixth year of Darius (516/515 BCE). (Ezra 6:15)

The Book of Ezra dates Ezra's arrival in Jerusalem to the second year of Artaxerxes. Its position in the narrative implies that he was Artaxerxes I in which case the year was 458 BCE. Ezra, a scholar of the commandments of Yahweh, was commissioned by Artaxerxes to rebuild the Temple and enforce the laws of Moses in Beyond the River. Ezra led a large party of exiles back to Yehud, where he found that Jews had intermarried with the "peoples of the land" and immediately banned intermarriage. (Ezra 6–10)

In the 20th year of Artaxerxes (almost definitely Artaxerxes I, whose twentieth year was 445/444 BCE) Nehemiah, the cup-bearer to the king and in a high official post, was informed that the wall of Jerusalem had been destroyed and was granted permission to return to Jerusalem to rebuild it. He succeeded in doing so but encountered strong resistance from the "people of the land," the officials of Samaria (the province immediately to the north of Yehud, the former kingdom of Israel) and other provinces and peoples around Jerusalem. (Nehemiah 1–7)

In Nehemiah 8, the narrative abruptly switches back to Ezra, apparently with no change in the chronology, but the year is not specified. The Book of Nehemiah says Ezra gathered the Jews together to read and enforce the law (his original commission from Darius but put into effect only now, 14 years after his arrival). Ezra argued to the people that failure to keep the law had caused the Exile. The Jews then agreed to separate themselves from the "peoples of the land" (once again, intermarriage was banned), keep the Sabbath and generally observe the Law. (Nehemiah 8–12)

=== Attempt at matching with historical chronology ===
There is no complete agreement on the chronology of the Neo-Babylonian and Achaemenid periods: the following table is used in this article, but alternative dates for many events are plausible. That is especially true of the chronological sequence of Ezra and Nehemiah, with Ezra 7:6–8 stating that Ezra came to Jerusalem "in the seventh year of Artaxerxes the King," without specifying whether he was Artaxerxes I (465–424 BCE) or Artaxerxes II (404–358 BCE). The probable date for his mission is 458 BCE, but it is possible that it took place in 398 BCE.

Year	Event
587 BCE	Conquest of Jerusalem and destruction of Solomon's Temple by the Babylonians; second deportation (first deportation in 597); Gedaliah installed as governor in Mizpah
582? BCE	Assassination of Gedaliah; refugees flee to Egypt; third deportation to Babylon
562 BCE	Jeconiah, 19th king of Judah, deported and imprisoned in Babylon in 597, released; remains in Babylon
539 BCE	Cyrus the Great (Cyrus II, ruled c. 559–530 BCE) and his army conquer Babylon
538 BCE	"Declaration of Cyrus" allowing Jews to return to Jerusalem
530 BCE	Cambyses II (ruled 530–522 BCE) succeeds Cyrus
525 BCE	Cambyses II conquers Egypt
522 BCE	Darius I (ruled 522–486 BCE) succeeds Cambyses II
521 BCE	Negotiations in Babylon between Darius I and the exiled Jews
520 BCE	Return to Jerusalem of Zerubbabel as the governor of Yehud and of Joshua the Priest as the High Priest of Israel
520–515 BCE	Rebuilding of the Temple in Jerusalem (Second Temple)
458? BCE	Arrival in Jerusalem of Ezra (7th year of the reign of Artaxerxes I, ruled 465–424 BCE)
445/444 BCE	Arrival in Jerusalem of Nehemiah (20th year of the reign of Artaxerxes I)
397? BCE (possible)	Arrival in Jerusalem of Ezra (7th year of the reign of Artaxerxes II, ruled 404–358 BCE)
333/332 BCE	Alexander the Great conquers the Mediterranean provinces of the Achaemenid Empire; beginning of Hellenistic period

== Archaeology ==
Obverse of Yehud coinage from Yehud Medinata

The results of archaeological excavations and surveys suggest that in comparison to late Iron Age Judah, late Persian period Yehud was a rural province with no more than half as many settlements as the late Iron Age, and a much smaller population. Jerusalem had shrunk to its pre-eighth century proportions and also had a much smaller population, which now concentrated in the Temple Mount and the City of David, especially near the Pool of Siloam. The most impressive building plan of the period was discovered at Ein Gedi.

Throughout the fourth century BCE, the province of Yehud was home to a network of strongholds. One of these is Hurvat Eres, a little rectangular fort that was discovered atop Har HaRuach, north of Kiryat Ye'arim. Other noteworthy non-urban sites from the period include a fortress and agricultural estate found in Har Adar, as well as an agricultural estate in Qalandia.

== See also ==
- History of the Jews and Judaism in the Land of Israel
  - Jew (word)
  - Zion
  - Nebuchadnezzar Chronicle
- Second Temple period
  - Second Temple Judaism
  - Yehud coinage
  - Cyrus the Great in the Bible
  - Timeline of Second Temple period Judaism#Persian Empire (538 BCE – 332 BCE)
- History of Israel and Judah
