= Nehemiah =

Central figure of the biblical Book of Nehemiah

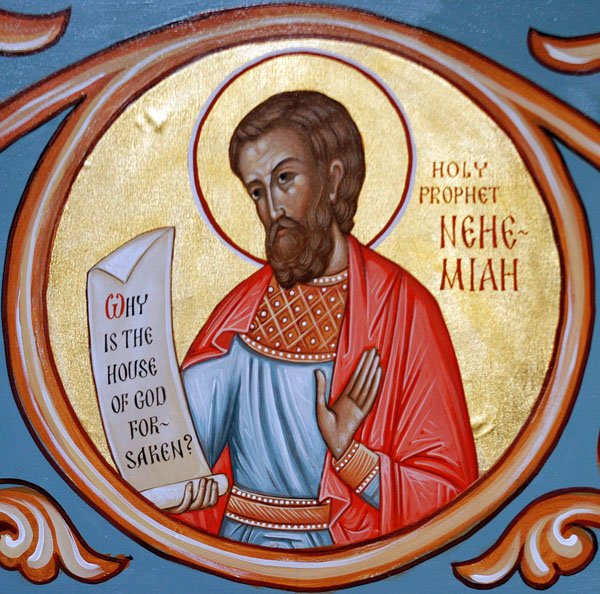
- American Orthodox icon

Prophet and Leader of the Israelites
- Born: c. 473 BC; Judea, Persian Empire
- Died: c. 403 BC (aged 70); Judea, Persian Empire
- Honored in: Eastern Orthodox Church
- Feast: 13 July (Catholic); Sunday of the Holy Forefathers (Orthodox)

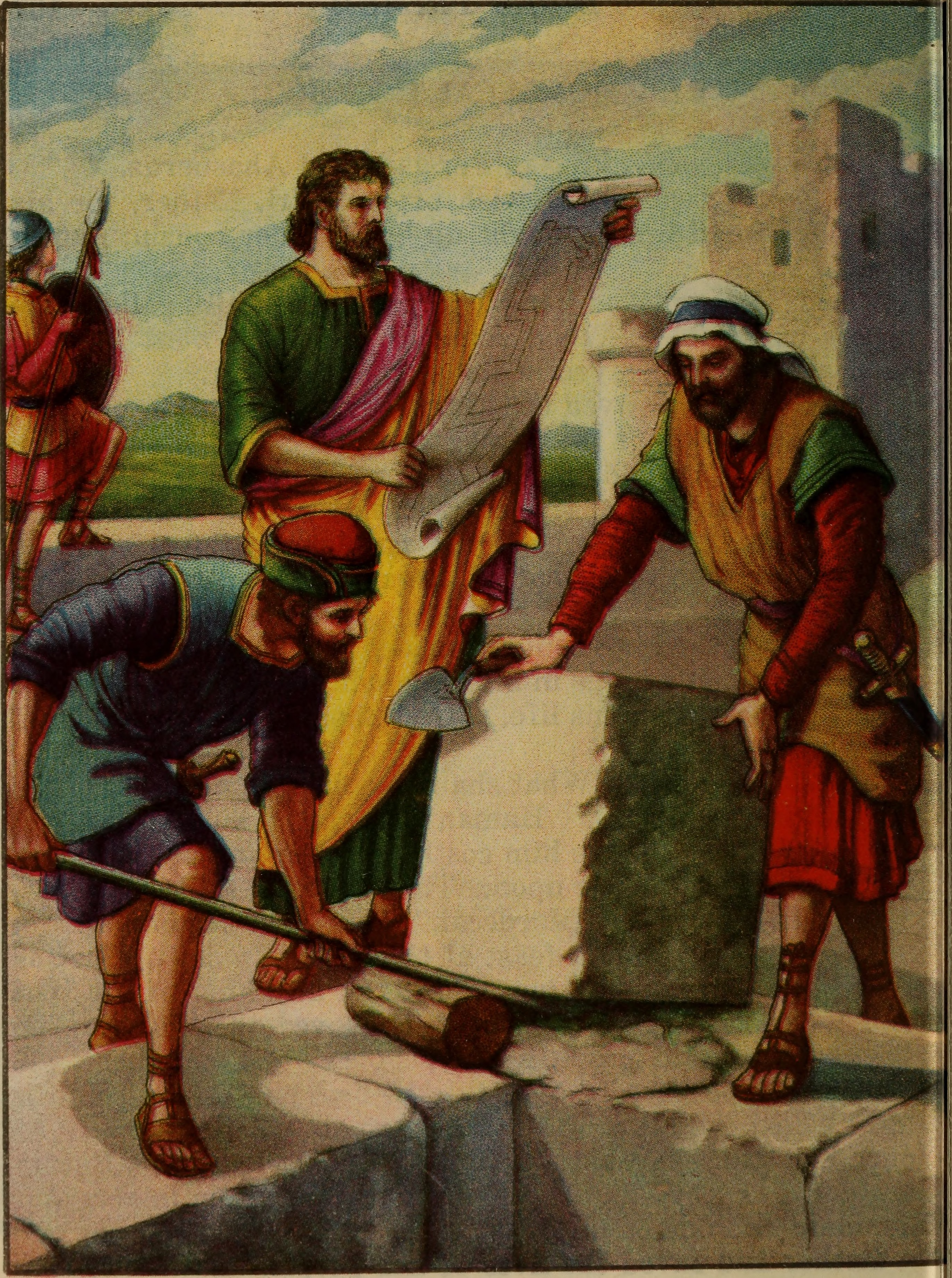
Nehemiah rebuilding Jerusalem, illustration by Adolf Hult, 1919

Nehemiah (/ˌniːəˈmaɪə/; Biblical Hebrew: נְחֶמְיָה, romanized: Nəḥemyā, lit. 'Yahweh comforts') is the central figure of the Book of Nehemiah, which describes his work in rebuilding Jerusalem during the Second Temple period as the governor of Yehud Medinta, the autonomous province of Judea within the Achaemenid Empire, under Artaxerxes I (465–424 BC).

The historicity of Nehemiah, his mission, and the Nehemiah Memoir have recently become controversial in academic scholarship, with maximalists viewing it as a historical account and minimalists doubting whether Nehemiah existed. He is considered a saint in the Eastern Orthodox Church, where he is commemorated on the Sunday of the Holy Forefathers.

== Book of Nehemiah narrative ==
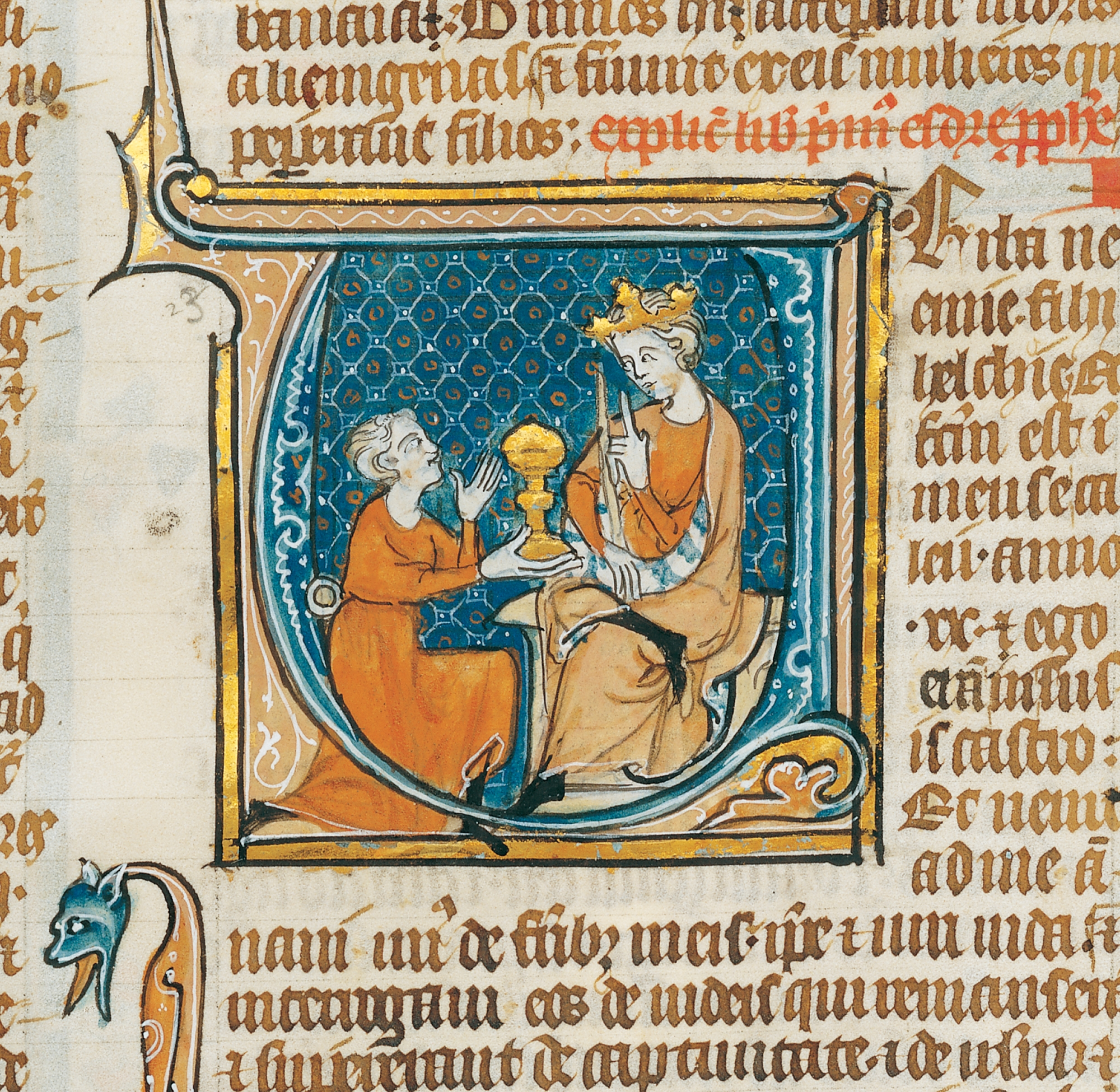
Nehemiah as cup-bearer to Artaxerxes I (French bible, c. 1280–1300)

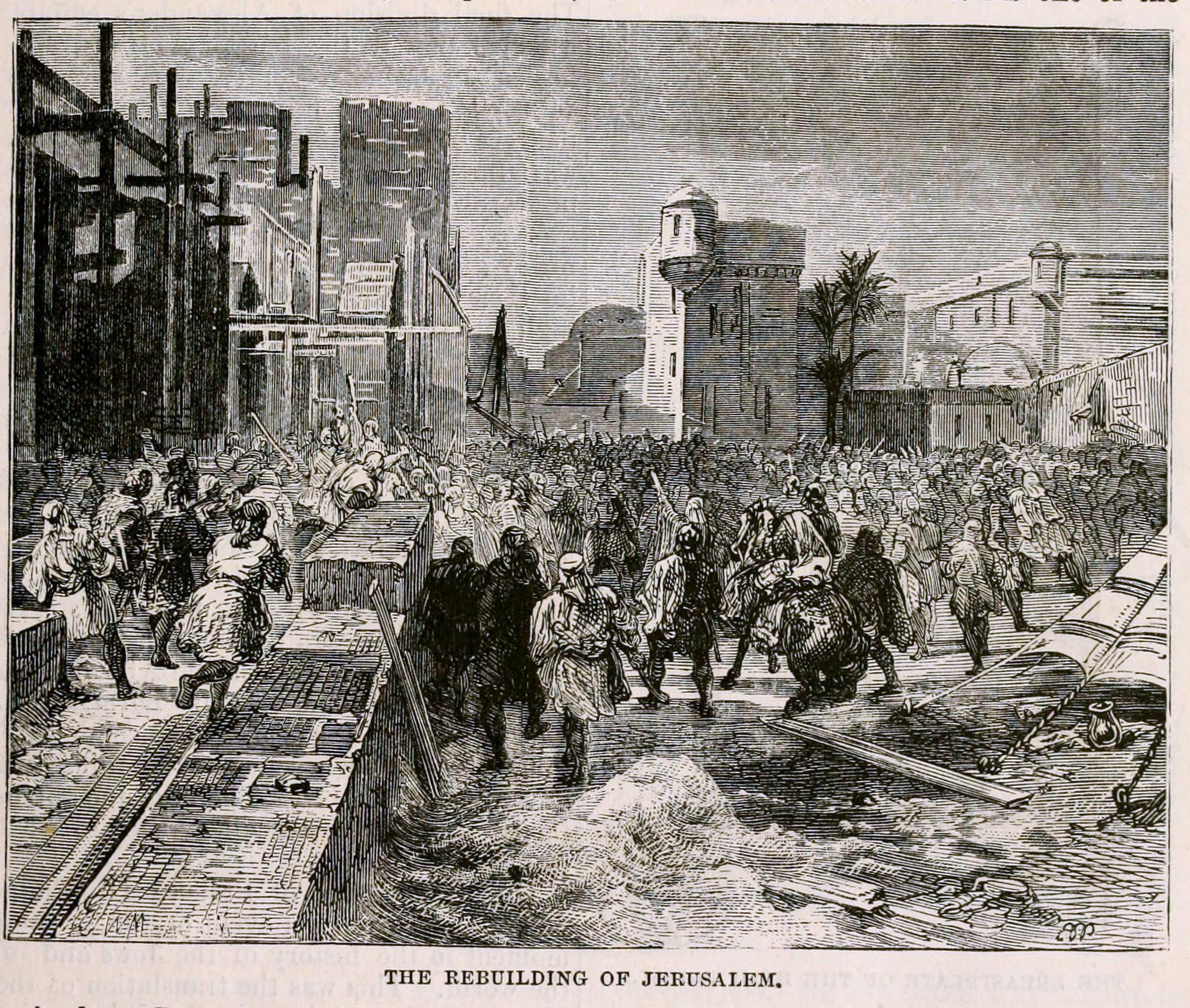
The Rebuilding of Jerusalem

In the 20th year (445 or 444 BC) of the reign of Artaxerxes I, the Achaemenid emperor, Nehemiah was cup-bearer to the king. Learning that the remnant population in Judea were in distress and that the walls of Jerusalem were broken down, he asked the king for permission to return and rebuild the city (Nehemiah 1:1-2:5) around 13 years after his contemporary, Ezra's arrival in Jerusalem in ca. 458 BC. Artaxerxes sent him to Judah as provincial governor with a mission to rebuild, gave letters explaining his support for the venture, and provision for timber from the king's forest (Nehemiah 2:6-9). Once there, Nehemiah defied the opposition of Judah's enemies on all sides (Samarians under Sanballat the Horonite, Ammonites, and Arabs) and rebuilt the walls within 52 days, from the Sheep Gate in the North, the Hananeel Tower at the North West corner, the Fish Gate in the West, the Furnaces Tower at the Temple Mount's South West corner, the Dung Gate in the South, the East Gate and the gate beneath the Golden Gate in the East.

No archaeological evidence supports the existence of a harem or the seclusion of women from contact with men in Achaemenid Persia. They appeared freely in public at all levels of society. However, the ancient Greeks portrayed Persians as engaging in the segregation of the sexes, and earlier scholars suggested Nehemiah's appearance in the presence of the Achaemenid queen consort (שֵׁגָל) alongside the king in Nehemiah 2:6 (הַמֶּ֜לֶךְ וְהַשֵּׁגַ֣ל ׀ יוֹשֶׁ֣בֶת אֶצְל֗וֹ "the king with the consort seated at his side") indicated that he was a eunuch, as he must have been inside the harem. In the vaticanus copy of the Septuagint, the earliest translation of the Hebrew Bible, he is described as such: eunochos (Koine Greek: εὐνοῦχος, romanized: eunuch), rather than oinochoos "cup-bearer" (οινοχόος). If so, the attempt by his enemy Shemaiah to trick him into entering the Temple is aimed at making him break religious commandments rather than simply hide from assassins. Other Septuagint manuscripts preserved the "cupbearer" reference, however, and no proof exists Nehemiah was ever a eunuch, as many Persian cupbearers were not.

Nehemiah took measures to repopulate the city and purify the community, enforcing the cancellation of debt, assisting Ezra in publicizing the law of Moses, and enforcing the divorce of Jewish men from their non-Jewish wives.

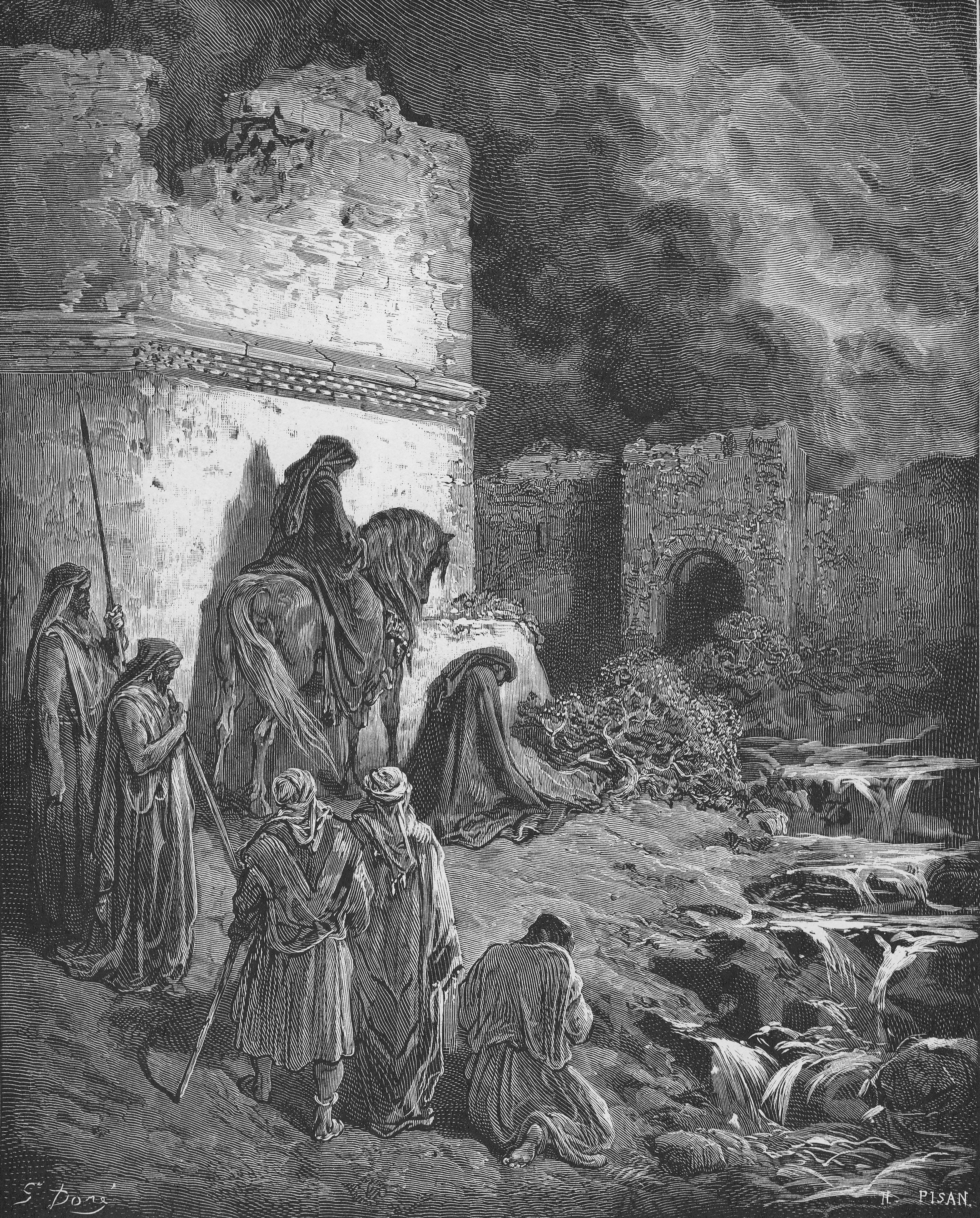
Gustave Doré, Nehemiah Views the Ruins of Jerusalem's Walls, 1866

After twelve years as governor, during which he ruled with justice and righteousness, he returned to the king in Susa. After spending some time in Susa, he returned to Jerusalem, only to find that the people had reverted to their evil ways. Non-Jews were permitted to conduct business inside Jerusalem on Shabbat and to keep rooms in the Temple. Greatly angered, he purified the Temple and the Kohenim and Levites and enforced the observance of the law of Moses.

== Book of Maccabees ==
The 2 Maccabees states that Nehemiah is the one who brought the holy fire for the altar back from the diaspora to Jerusalem and founded a library of the Holy Scriptures, just as Judas Maccabeus did. Here, Nehemiah's political role sets an example for the Hasmonean dynasty and serves as a model for pious national leadership in general. The scene of reading and explaining the Torah in Nehemiah 8 became the model of synagogue worship. See 2 Maccabees 2:13.

== Book of Sirach ==
The hymn in praise of the forefathers in the Book of Sirach mentions only Nehemiah (not Ezra) after Zerubbabel and Joshua, and praises him for his building activities in Sirach 49:13.

== In rabbinic literature ==
One rabbinic text, or aggadah, identifies Nehemiah as Zerubbabel, with the latter being considered an epithet and indicating that he was born in Babylon. Another oral tradition, or mishnah, records that Nehemiah was blamed for seeming to boast (Neh. v. 19 & xiii. 31), and disparage his predecessors (Neh. v. 15). This tradition asserts that his book was appended to the Book of Ezra, as a consequence, rather than being a separate book in its own right, as it is in the Christian Old Testament. The Baba Bathra records that Nehemiah completed the Book of Chronicles, which was said to have been written by Ezra.

== Veneration ==
Nehemias is venerated in the Catholic Church and the Orthodox Church:

- July 13 – commemoration (Catholic Church),
- Sunday of the Forefathers – movable holiday on Sunday that falls between December 11–17.

== See also ==
- Governors of Yehud Medinata
- Sanballat the Horonite
- Tobiah (Ammonite)
