= Tobiah (Ammonite) =

Ammonite official in the Hebrew Bible

According to the Book of Nehemiah in the Hebrew Bible and the Old Testament, Tobiah was an Ammonite official who attempted to hinder Nehemiah's efforts to rebuild Jerusalem after the Babylonian exile, and took over the storerooms of the Temple for his own use.

== Biblical account of Tobiah's actions ==
=== Opposition to Nehemiah's rebuilding effort ===
Tobiah was an Ammonite official (possibly a governor of Ammon, possibly also of Jewish descent). He incited the Ammonites to hinder Nehemiah's efforts to rebuild Jerusalem. He, along with Sanballat the Horonite and Geshem the Arabian, resorted to a stratagem and, pretending to wish a conference with Nehemiah, invited him to meet them at Ono, Benjamin. Four times they made the request, and every time Nehemiah refused to come. Their object was to frighten him from completing the restoration of Jerusalem's walls and to do him some kind of harm.

Tobiah also had married a daughter of Shecaniah, a Judahite leader, and had given his son, Jehohanan, in marriage to the daughter of Meshullam, another Judahite leader, for ostensibly political purposes. Because of this, he somehow gained enough of a Judahite coalition to use the Judahites themselves to send letters to Nehemiah, telling him of Tobiah's "good deeds" in an apparent attempt to weaken Nehemiah's resolve to keep Tobiah out of the rebuilding effort. Tobiah meanwhile sent intimidating letters directly to Nehemiah.

=== Acquisition of the temple storerooms ===
Additionally, Tobiah exploited his relationship with High Priest Eliashib, whose grandson had married the daughter of Sanballat. He persuaded Eliashib to lease the storerooms of the temple to him, so that he could conduct business in the newly constructed temple. These storerooms had been intended for the Israelites' grain offerings, incense, temple articles, and the tithes of grain, new wine and oil meant for the work of the temple and the temple workers themselves. Upon hearing this, Nehemiah, who was then in Babylon serving Artaxerxes I of Persia, requested permission to return to Judah. After returning, he promptly threw all of Tobiah's belongings out of the temple room, purified the room, and put back all that had originally been there.

== Identity ==
It is possible, though uncertain, that Tobiah the Ammonite may be related to other Tobiahs mentioned in extra-biblical sources. The Lachish Ostraca mention a Tobiah who is a "servant of the king". Josephus later mentions a rich and influential Tobiad family from around the geographic region of Ammon, which may be descended from or otherwise related to this same Tobiah. Archaeological evidence shows that the site of 'Iraq al-Amir, the seat of the Tobiad family, was occupied during the Persian period.
