= Nehemiah 13 =

Chapter in the Old Testament Book of Nehemiah

- ← chapter 12 Esther 1 →
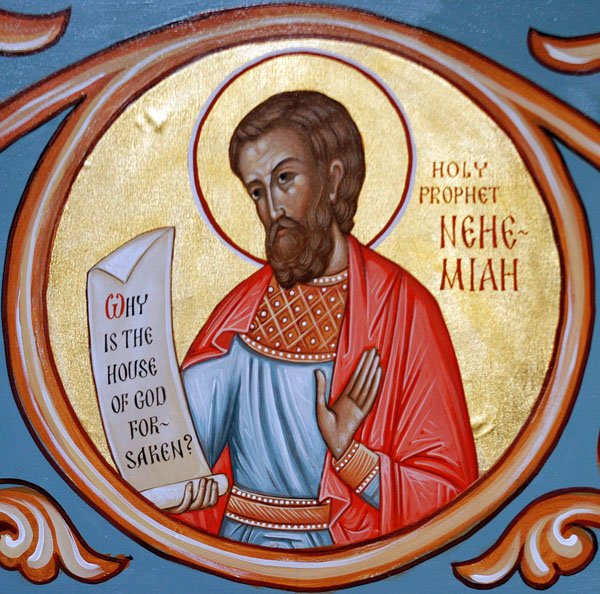
- Greek Orthodox Icon of Nehemiah, mounted on solid wood.
- Book: Book of Nehemiah
- Category: Ketuvim
- Christian Bible part: Old Testament
- Order in the Christian part: 16

Nehemiah 13 is the thirteenth (and the final) chapter of the Book of Nehemiah in the Old Testament of the Christian Bible, or the 23rd chapter of the book of Ezra-Nehemiah in the Hebrew Bible, which treats the book of Ezra and the book of Nehemiah as one book. Jewish tradition states that Ezra is the author of Ezra-Nehemiah as well as the Book of Chronicles, but modern scholars generally accept that a compiler from the 5th century BCE (the so-called "Chronicler") is the final author of these books. This chapter addresses a series of problems handled by Nehemiah himself, which had arisen during his temporary absence from the land, with some similar issues to those related in Ezra 9–10 and Nehemiah 10.

== Text ==
The original text of this chapter is in Hebrew language. This chapter is divided into 31 verses.

=== Textual witnesses ===
Some early manuscripts containing the text of this chapter in Hebrew are of the Masoretic Text, which includes Codex Leningradensis (1008). (Note: Since the anti-Jewish riots in Aleppo in 1947, the whole book of Ezra-Nehemiah has been missing from the text of the Aleppo Codex.)

There is also a translation into Koine Greek known as the Septuagint, made in the last few centuries BCE. Extant ancient manuscripts of the Septuagint version include Codex Vaticanus (B; $\mathfrak{G}$^{B}; 4th century), Codex Sinaiticus (S; BHK: $\mathfrak{G}$^{S}; 4th century), and Codex Alexandrinus (A; $\mathfrak{G}$^{A}; 5th century).

== Purification (13:1–3) ==
The opening verses record the obedience of the people at that period of time to the words of the Mosaic law, that they took "immediate" response (verse 3); in this case, by removing all people of foreign descents ("mixed multitude").

=== Verse 1 ===
On that day they read in the book of Moses in the audience of the people; and therein was found written, that the Ammonite and the Moabite should not come into the congregation of God for ever;

The exclusion of the Ammonites and Moabites from the sanctuary is written in Deuteronomy 23:3–6, because of two reasons (verse 2):

1. Their failure to provide the Israelites the basic requirements of food and water
2. The Moabite king Balak had hired Balaam to curse Israel (Numbers 22–24), although God turned these curses into great blessings (Numbers 23:8, 20; 24:1, 10).

== The reforms of Nehemiah (13:4–31) ==
After 12 years in Jerusalem, Nehemiah returned to the court of Artaxerxes (verse 6), but during his absence, various abuses sprang up which he had to handle emphatically as recorded in this section. The cause of the offences can be traced to the religious laxity in the community, especially with close relationship of the priests with Tobiah (verse 4) and the family alliance of a grandson of Eliashib, the high priest, with Sanballat the Horonite (verse 28). Nehemiah took drastic measures to eradicate the ill:

- Tobiah's "household stuffs" were thrown out of the temple complex (verse 8), which foreshadows Jesus' action of temple clearance (John 2:13ff). Tobiah's house within the temple apparently was a base of his operation (verses 4–5), by 'using a privileged position in the temple economy to pursue [an] advantageous business arrangement'.
- The temple was cleansed of everything unholy (verse 9)
- The Levites, who fled to their "fields" (as they were permitted to raise animals according to Numbers 35:2), were restored to their positions with the arrangements to receive once again their dues for the service for God (verses 11–13)
- Guards were placed on the gates to prevent violation of Sabbath rules by trading (verses 19, 22) and a threat was issues for those who attempted to break the rules (verse 21)
- Harsh treatment was performed by Nehemiah on those who had married foreign women (verse 25).
- The errant grandson of Eliashib was banished (verse 28).

Nehemiah also reestablished the previous good conditions in chapters 10 and 12 by putting people under oath once more (verse 25; cf. Nehemiah 10:29) and set up provisions for the regular service of the Temple (verses 30–31; cf. Nehemiah 10:32ff, Nehemiah 12:44ff).

=== Verse 6 ===
But during all this I was not in Jerusalem, for in the thirty-second year of Artaxerxes king of Babylon I had returned to the king. Then after certain days I obtained leave from the king,

"The thirty-second year of Artaxerxes" corresponds to 433 BC. Thus, Nehemiah was governor of Judah from 445 to 433 BC, then he stayed in Susa for an unknown period of time before returning to Jerusalem. The text does not specify in what capacity he returned, although it was with authorisation from the king: he probably continued to be the governor until 407 BC, when Bigvai became governor.

=== Verse 31 ===
And for the wood offering, at times appointed, and for the firstfruits.
Remember me, O my God, for good.

- "Remember me": Just as in verses 14, 22, Nehemiah cried out for God to watch over him, during his confrontation with the priests and Levites regarding the defilement of their holy status which made them disqualified to serve.

== See also ==
- Artaxerxes I
- Jerusalem
- Related Bible parts: Ezra 9, Ezra 10, Nehemiah 10, Nehemiah 12

== Sources ==
- Fensham, F. Charles (1982). The Books of Ezra and Nehemiah. New international commentary on the Old Testament (illustrated ed.). Wm. B. Eerdmans Publishing. ISBN 978-0802825278.
- Grabbe, Lester L. (2003). "Nehemiah". In Dunn, James D. G.; Rogerson, John William (eds.). Eerdmans Commentary on the Bible (illustrated ed.). Wm. B. Eerdmans Publishing. pp. 320–328. ISBN 978-0802837110.
- Halley, Henry H. (1965). Halley's Bible Handbook: an abbreviated Bible commentary (24th (revised) ed.). Zondervan Publishing House. ISBN 0-310-25720-4.
- Larson, Knute; Dahlen, Kathy; Anders, Max E. (2005). Anders, Max E. (ed.). Holman Old Testament Commentary - Ezra, Nehemiah, Esther. Vol. 9 (illustrated ed.). B&H Publishing Group. ISBN 978-0805494693.
- Levering, Matthew (2007). Ezra & Nehemiah. Brazos Theological Commentary on the Bible. Brazos Press. ISBN 978-1587431616.
- McConville, J. G. (1985). Ezra, Nehemiah, and Esther. The daily study Bible : Old Testament. Westminster John Knox Press. ISBN 978-0664245832.
- Smith, Gary (2018). Ezra, Nehemiah, Esther. Cornerstone Biblical Commentary. Vol. 5. Tyndale House. ISBN 978-1414399126.
- Smith-Christopher, Daniel L. (2007). "15. Ezra-Nehemiah". In Barton, John; Muddiman, John (eds.). The Oxford Bible Commentary (first (paperback) ed.). Oxford University Press. pp. 308–324. ISBN 978-0199277186.
- Würthwein, Ernst (1995). The Text of the Old Testament. Translated by Rhodes, Erroll F. Grand Rapids, MI: Wm. B. Eerdmans. ISBN 0-8028-0788-7.
