= Nehemiah 7 =

Chapter in the Old Testament Book of Nehemiah

- ← chapter 6 chapter 8 →
- Book: Book of Nehemiah
- Category: Ketuvim
- Christian Bible part: Old Testament
- Order in the Christian part: 16

Nehemiah 7 is the seventh chapter of the Book of Nehemiah in the Old Testament of the Christian Bible, or the 17th chapter of the book of Ezra-Nehemiah in the Hebrew Bible, which treats the book of Ezra and the book of Nehemiah as one book. Jewish tradition states that Ezra is the author of Ezra-Nehemiah as well as the Book of Chronicles, but modern scholars generally accept that a compiler from the 5th century BCE (the so-called "Chronicler") is the final author of these books. This chapter records the joint appointments of Hanani and Hananiah over Jerusalem and the second appearance of the Golah ("exiles") list, that is, the list of the first returning group of Jews from Babylon, which was documented earlier in Ezra 2 with few variations.

== Text ==
The original text of this chapter is in Hebrew language. This chapter is divided into 73 verses.

=== Textual witnesses ===
Some early manuscripts containing the text of this chapter in Hebrew are of the Masoretic Text, which includes Codex Leningradensis (1008). (Note: Since the anti-Jewish riots in Aleppo in 1947, the whole book of Ezra-Nehemiah has been missing from the text of the Aleppo Codex.)

There is also a translation into Koine Greek known as the Septuagint, made in the last few centuries BCE. Extant ancient manuscripts of the Septuagint version include Codex Vaticanus (B; $\mathfrak{G}$^{B}; 4th century), Codex Sinaiticus (S; BHK: $\mathfrak{G}$^{S}; 4th century), and Codex Alexandrinus (A; $\mathfrak{G}$^{A}; 5th century).

An ancient Greek book called 1 Esdras (Greek: Ἔσδρας Αʹ), containing some parts of 2 Chronicles and Ezra and one section from Nehemiah, is included in most editions of the Septuagint and is placed before the single book of Ezra–Nehemiah (which is titled in Greek: Ἔσδρας Βʹ). 1 Esdras 9:37-55 is equivalent to Nehemiah 7:73-8:12, providing an account of Ezra's reading of the Law of Moses.

== Vigilance (verses 1–3) ==
The wall around Jerusalem was not the ultimate security but 'a necessary defense and dynamic distinctive symbol' of the Jews among the surrounding nations, so the inhabitants have to participate in the system to protect the city.

=== Verses 1–2 ===
^{1} Now when the wall had been built and I had set up the doors, and the gatekeepers, the singers, and the Levites had been appointed, ^{2} I gave my brother Hanani and Hananiah the governor of the castle charge over Jerusalem, for he was a more faithful and God-fearing man than many.

- "Castle": "citadel" (NKJV) or "palace" (KJV).

=== Verse 4 ===
Now the city was large and spacious, but the people in it were few, and the houses were not rebuilt.

The Revised Standard Version reads ... no houses had been built, the Revised Version, the houses were not builded. H. E. Ryle counsels against a literal interpretation of these words, suggesting that the real meaning was that there were large open spaces within the walls where more houses could be built.

== The census (verses 4–73a) ==
The defensive measures implemented by Nehemiah, Hanani and Hananiah were only for short-term, because the bigger goal was to reestablish Jerusalem as the center of Jewish culture and religious purity, so it has to be repopulated from some people who then lived outside the city. Nehemiah was looking for Jews with verifiable heritage to send some family members to populate Jerusalem, but instead of starting a census, he used the original listing of those who had been the first to return which specified clan origins. This list is almost an exact replication of the one in Ezra 2, with slight variations likely due to the transcribing and transmission over time.

=== Verse 7 ===
Who came with Zerubbabel, Jeshua, Nehemiah, Azariah, Raamiah, Nahamani, Mordecai, Bilshan, Mispereth, Bigvai, Nehum, Baanah. The number, I say, of the men of the people of Israel was this;

Zerubbabel was the leader of the group and of the Davidic line (see 1 Chronicles 3:19). He is associated with the messianic hope in the Book of Zechariah, although nothing of this is mentioned in Nehemiah. His office is not named in this book, but he is identified as the "governor of Judah" in Haggai 1:1, 14, and 2:2. The office of Jeshua (or "Joshua") is not mentioned in this book, but he is identified as the "High Priest of Israel" in Haggai 1:1, 12, 14; 2:2; Zechariah 3:1. Some names are written differently in the Book of Ezra (2:2):

Ezra 2:2	Nehemiah 7:7
Seraiah	Azariah
Reelaiah	Raamiah
Mispar	Mispereth
Rehum	Nehum

Most versions of Ezra 2:2 do not include Nahamani, and therefore only list eleven returnees.

== Verse 73 ==
So the priests, the Levites, the gatekeepers, the singers, some of the people, the temple servants, and all Israel, lived in their towns. And when the seventh month had come, the people of Israel were in their towns.

This verse ends the census material and commences a new section, which extends into chapter 8. The version contained in 1 Esdras records the assembly in this passage immediately after the dismissal of foreign wives recounted in Ezra 9-10.

== See also ==
- Jerusalem
- Nebuchadnezzar II
- Related Bible parts: Ezra 2, Nehemiah 1

== Sources ==
- Fensham, F. Charles (1982). The Books of Ezra and Nehemiah. New international commentary on the Old Testament (illustrated ed.). Wm. B. Eerdmans Publishing. ISBN 978-0802825278.
- Grabbe, Lester L. (2003). "Nehemiah". In Dunn, James D. G.; Rogerson, John William (eds.). Eerdmans Commentary on the Bible (illustrated ed.). Wm. B. Eerdmans Publishing. pp. 320–328. ISBN 978-0802837110.
- Halley, Henry H. (1965). Halley's Bible Handbook: an abbreviated Bible commentary (24th (revised) ed.). Zondervan Publishing House. ISBN 0-310-25720-4.
- Larson, Knute; Dahlen, Kathy; Anders, Max E. (2005). Anders, Max E. (ed.). Holman Old Testament Commentary - Ezra, Nehemiah, Esther. Vol. 9 (illustrated ed.). B&H Publishing Group. ISBN 978-0805494693.
- Levering, Matthew (2007). Ezra & Nehemiah. Brazos Theological Commentary on the Bible. Brazos Press. ISBN 978-1587431616.
- McConville, J. G. (1985). Ezra, Nehemiah, and Esther. The daily study Bible : Old Testament. Westminster John Knox Press. ISBN 978-0664245832.
- Smith-Christopher, Daniel L. (2007). "15. Ezra-Nehemiah". In Barton, John; Muddiman, John (eds.). The Oxford Bible Commentary (first (paperback) ed.). Oxford University Press. pp. 308–324. ISBN 978-0199277186.
- Würthwein, Ernst (1995). The Text of the Old Testament. Translated by Rhodes, Erroll F. Grand Rapids, MI: Wm. B. Eerdmans. ISBN 0-8028-0788-7.
