= Ezra 8 =

Chapter in the Book of Ezra

- ← chapter 7 chapter 9 →
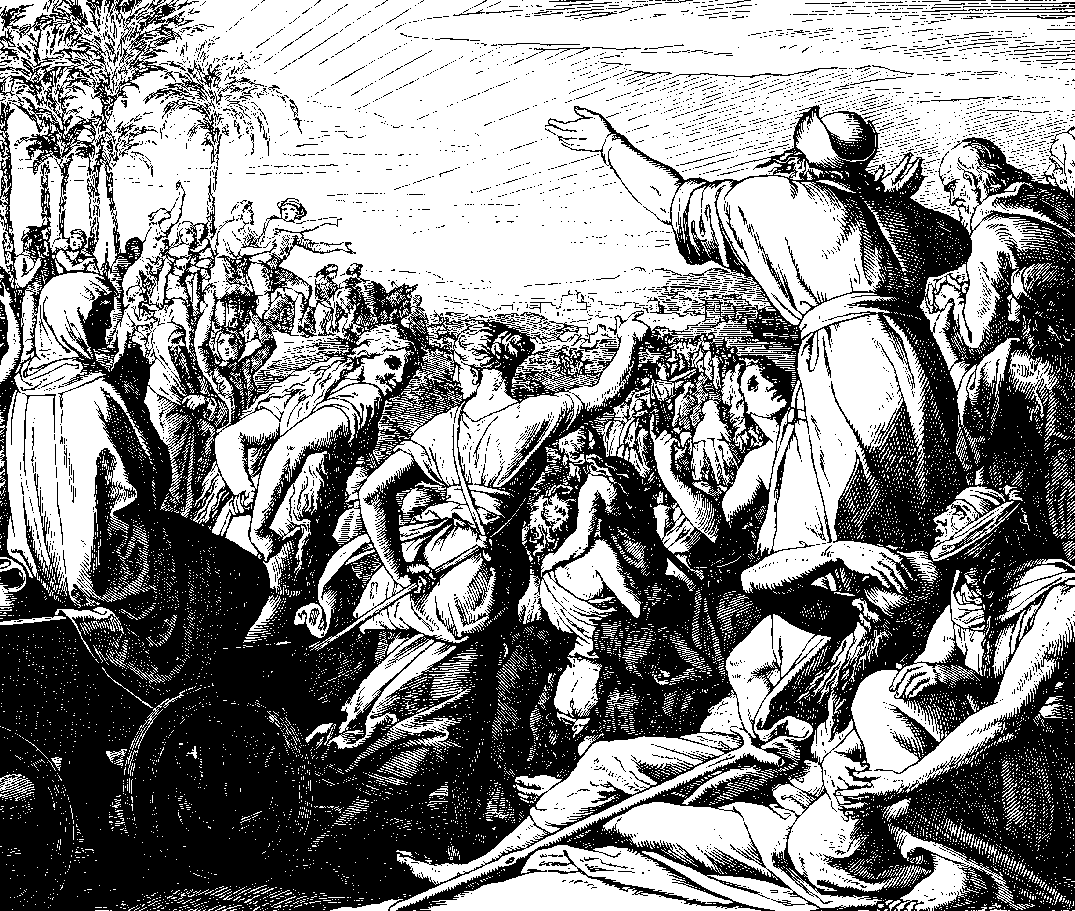
- The return from exile is depicted in this woodcut for Die Bibel in Bildern, 1860, by Julius Schnorr von Carolsfeld.
- Book: Book of Ezra
- Category: Ketuvim
- Christian Bible part: Old Testament
- Order in the Christian part: 15

Ezra 8 is the eighth chapter of the Book of Ezra in the Old Testament of the Christian Bible, or the book of Ezra-Nehemiah in the Hebrew Bible, which treats the book of Ezra and book of Nehemiah as one book. Jewish tradition states that Ezra is the author of Ezra-Nehemiah as well as the Book of Chronicles, but modern scholars generally accept that a compiler from the 5th century BCE (the so-called "Chronicler") is the final author of these books. The section comprising chapters 7 to 10 mainly describes of activities of Ezra the scribe and the priest. This chapter follows Ezra's journey to Jerusalem and includes a genealogy of those returning with him (parallel to chapter 2).

== Text ==
This chapter is divided into 36 verses. The original text of this chapter is in Hebrew language.

=== Textual witnesses ===
Some early manuscripts containing the text of this chapter in Hebrew are of the Masoretic Text, which includes Codex Leningradensis (1008). (Note: Since 1947 the current text of Aleppo Codex is missing the whole book of Ezra-Nehemiah.)

There is also a translation into Koine Greek known as the Septuagint, made in the last few centuries BCE. Extant ancient manuscripts of the Septuagint version include Codex Vaticanus (B; $\mathfrak{G}$^{B}; 4th century), and Codex Alexandrinus (A; $\mathfrak{G}$^{A}; 5th century). (Note: The extant Codex Sinaiticus only contains Ezra 9:9–10:44.)

An ancient Greek book called 1 Esdras (Greek: Ἔσδρας Αʹ) containing some parts of 2 Chronicles, Ezra and Nehemiah is included in most editions of the Septuagint and is placed before the single book of Ezra–Nehemiah (which is titled in Greek: Ἔσδρας Βʹ). 1 Esdras 8:28-67 is equivalent to Ezra 8, both texts listing the latter exiles who returned to Jerusalem with Ezra.

== The caravan (verses 1–14) ==
Large groups of Jews had returned to Jerusalem in earlier years, but many faithful men and their families still lived in Babylonian territories, some of whom at this time packed their belongings and assembled with Ezra to return to Judea. The list in this part is a parallel to the famous "Golah List" ("List of the Exiles") of Ezra 2 and Nehemiah 7, but notable here is the predominance of priestly associations before any Davidic identification.

=== Verse 1 ===
Now these are the chiefs of the households of the fathers and the genealogical register of those who went up with me from Babylon, in the reign of King Artaxerxes:

Emboldened by God's involvement (chapter 7), Ezra recruited family heads and those registered with them to accompany him to Jerusalem (as noted in Ezra 2, 'Jewish society was organized around men and their extended families').

=== Verse 2 ===
of the sons of Phinehas, Gershom;
of the sons of Ithamar, Daniel;
of the sons of David, Hattush,

The list begins with the priests, reflecting 'Ezra's own station as a priest', formed by two patriarchal families: the descendants of Phinehas (Gershom) and Ithamar (Daniel), as the two descendants of Aaron the high priest.

After listing the priestly line, Ezra registers the political line of Israel as far as verse 14, i.e. the descendants of David (royal line), indicating that 'the memory of Davidic ancestry continued in the postexilic community'. One family accompanying Ezra, Hattush, is a descendant of David (so called "Davidide"), and he would be the fourth generation after Zerubbabel (cf. 1 Chronicles 3:19–22: "^{19} …the sons of Zerubbabel… Hananiah… ^{21} And the sons of Hananiah… the sons of Shechaniah. ^{22} And the sons of Shechaniah… Shemaiah: and the sons of Shemaiah… Hattush…"). The record of "Hattush" 'makes any other date than 458 [BC] difficult'.

== Final preparations (verses 15–30) ==
Before departing from Babylonia. Ezra enlisted Levites to join his caravan, as well as 'called for a general fast to petition God's protection, and entrusted the money and valuable articles to consecrated priests'.

=== Verse 15 ===
Now I gathered them by the river that flows to Ahava, and we camped there three days. And I looked among the people and the priests, and found none of the sons of Levi there.

The absence of any Levites ("sons of Levi") was significant to Ezra because, under Law of Torah, the Levites were "responsible for the transport of temple articles". The equivalent text in the 1 Esdras refers here to "the river Theras".

=== Verse 22 ===
For I was ashamed to require of the king a band of soldiers and horsemen to help us against the enemy in the way: because we had spoken unto the king, saying, The hand of our God is upon all them for good that seek him; but his power and his wrath is against all them that forsake him.

In contrast to Nehemiah, who accepted an armed guard, Ezra chose to rely on God's protection (cf. 2 Kings 6:17; Matthew 26:53).

== The journey (verses 31–32) ==
Completing all the preparations, Ezra and his caravan 'embarked on the journey' from Babylonia to Jerusalem.

=== Verse 31 ===
Then we departed from the river of Ahava on the twelfth day of the first month, to go unto Jerusalem: and the hand of our God was upon us, and he delivered us from the hand of the enemy, and of such as lay in wait by the way.

- "The river of Ahava" ( Vulgate: "the river Ahava"; Latin: "a fiumine Ahava"): the meeting place probably takes its name from the stream. Ahava was reached by Ezra and his company on the ninth day after they left Babylon (cf. Ezra 7:9, Ezra 8:15), which helps Rawlinson to identify Ahava with "Is" as mentioned in Herodotus (i. 179), which is eight days' journey from Babylon. The modern name of the place is "Hit", which is famous for its bitumen springs, and is situated on the Euphrates, at a distance of about 80 miles northwest from Babylon. The distance from Hit to Jerusalem is 618 miles using modern roads.

=== Verse 32 ===
So we came to Jerusalem, and stayed there three days.

According to Ezra 7:8, Ezra and his caravan arrived on the first day of the fifth month.

- "Three days": The same "three days' interval" to 'rest after the journey and to prepare plans' is also used by Nehemiah (Nehemiah 2:11).

== Taking care of business (verses 33–36) ==
This part records that Ezra meticulously transferred the articles and finances, performed the required rituals of sacrifices, and delivered the edict of the Persian king.

=== Verse 35 ===
Also the children of those that had been carried away, which were come out of the captivity, offered burnt offerings unto the God of Israel, twelve bullocks for all Israel, ninety and six rams, seventy and seven lambs, twelve he goats for a sin offering: all this was a burnt offering unto the Lord.

After Ezra's group safely arrived in Jerusalem (verses 31–32), they offered sacrifice (verse 35), not because king Artaxerxes ordered them to do (7:17), nor as an "isolated act of thanksgiving", but because "they were reconstituted as the people of God and therefore must worship" God.

== See also ==
- Artaxerxes I
- Jerusalem
- Related Bible parts: Ezra 7

== Sources ==
- Fensham, F. Charles (1982). The Books of Ezra and Nehemiah. New international commentary on the Old Testament (illustrated ed.). Wm. B. Eerdmans Publishing. ISBN 978-0802825278.
- Grabbe, Lester L. (2003). "Ezra". In Dunn, James D. G.; Rogerson, John William (eds.). Eerdmans Commentary on the Bible (illustrated ed.). Wm. B. Eerdmans Publishing. pp. 313–319. ISBN 978-0802837110.
- Halley, Henry H. (1965). Halley's Bible Handbook: an abbreviated Bible commentary (24th (revised) ed.). Zondervan Publishing House. ISBN 0-310-25720-4.
- Larson, Knute; Dahlen, Kathy; Anders, Max E. (2005). Anders, Max E. (ed.). Holman Old Testament Commentary - Ezra, Nehemiah, Esther. Vol. 9 (illustrated ed.). B&H Publishing Group. ISBN 978-0805494693.
- Levering, Matthew (2007). Ezra & Nehemiah. Brazos Theological Commentary on the Bible. Brazos Press. ISBN 978-1587431616.
- McConville, J. G. (1985). Ezra, Nehemiah, and Esther. The daily study Bible : Old Testament. Westminster John Knox Press. ISBN 978-0664245832.
- Smith-Christopher, Daniel L. (2007). "15. Ezra-Nehemiah". In Barton, John; Muddiman, John (eds.). The Oxford Bible Commentary (first (paperback) ed.). Oxford University Press. pp. 308–324. ISBN 978-0199277186.
- Würthwein, Ernst (1995). The Text of the Old Testament. Translated by Rhodes, Erroll F. Grand Rapids, MI: Wm. B. Eerdmans. ISBN 0-8028-0788-7.
