= Nehemiah 2 =

Chapter from Nehemiah in the Old Testament

- ← chapter 1 chapter 3 →
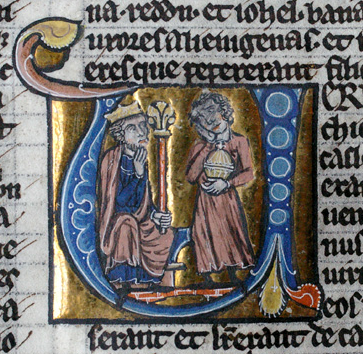
- Nehemiah presenting King Artaxerxes with a pyxis, miniature from the Bible of the Monastery of Santa Maria de Alcobaça, c. 1220s (National Library of Portugal ALC.455, fl.147).
- Book: Book of Nehemiah
- Category: Ketuvim
- Christian Bible part: Old Testament
- Order in the Christian part: 16

Nehemiah 2 is the second chapter of the Book of Nehemiah in the Old Testament of the Christian Bible, or the 12th chapter of the book of Ezra-Nehemiah in the Hebrew Bible, which treats the book of Ezra and the book of Nehemiah as one book. Jewish tradition states that Ezra is the author of Ezra-Nehemiah as well as the Book of Chronicles, but modern scholars generally accept that a compiler from the 5th century BCE (the so-called "Chronicler") is the final author of these books. From the time he hears about Jerusalem during the month of Kislev (November/December), Nehemiah waited until the month of Nisan (March/April) to petition Artaxerxes I of Persia to be allowed to go and help the rebuilding of Jerusalem. His petition is granted by the king, and although with less authority than Ezra over the officials of "Beyond-the-River", Nehemiah was given an official position with an escort of officers and cavalry.

== Text ==
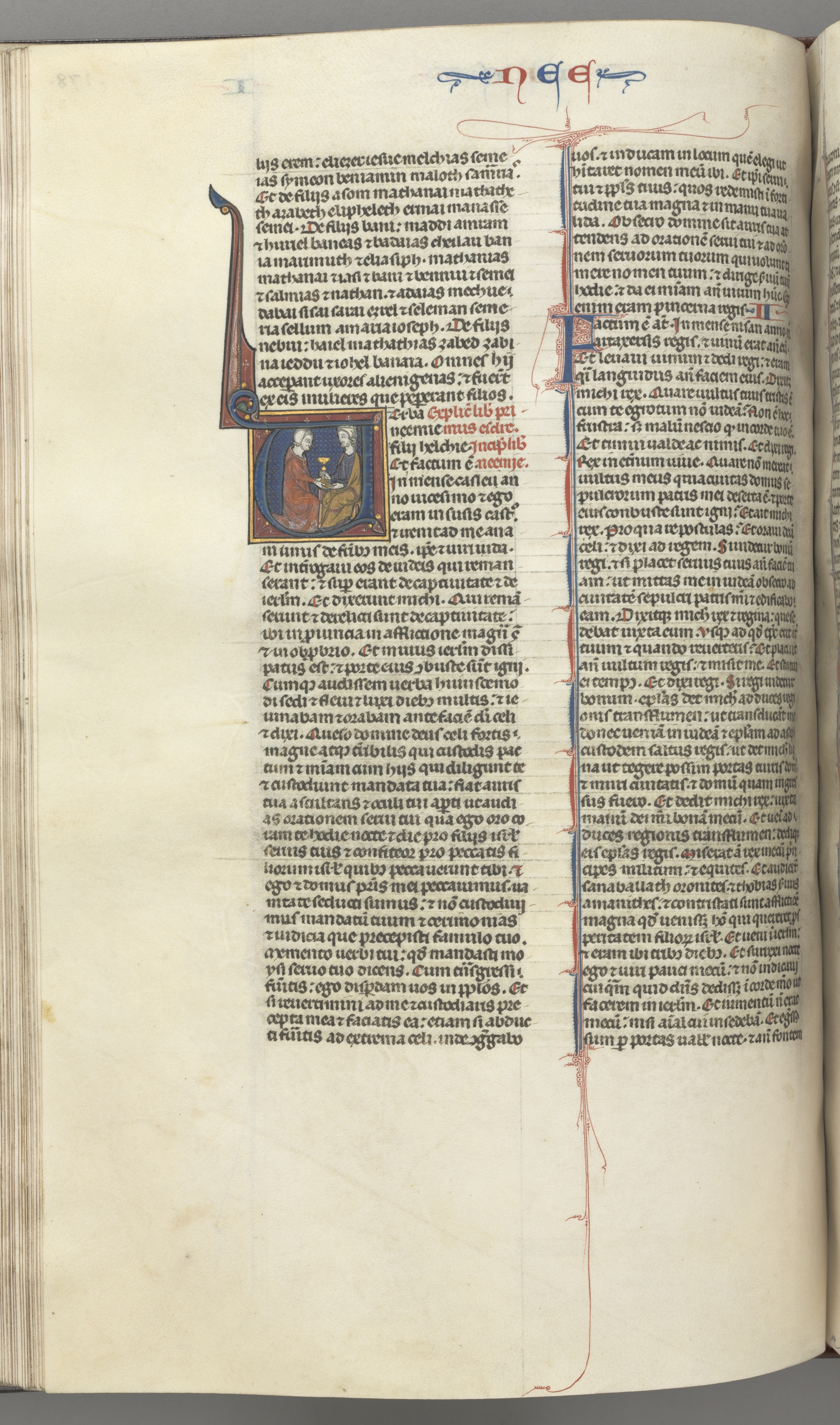
Nehemiah presenting the golden cup to Artaxerxes. Illustration on Fol. 178v of an illuminated manuscript in Latin (1270).

This chapter is divided into 20 verses. The original text of this chapter is in the Hebrew language.

=== Textual witnesses ===
Some early manuscripts containing the text of this chapter in Hebrew are of the Masoretic Text, which includes Codex Leningradensis (1008). (Note: Since 1947 the whole book of Ezra-Nehemiah has been missing from the text of the Aleppo Codex.)

There is also a translation into Koine Greek known as the Septuagint, made in the last few centuries BCE. Extant ancient manuscripts of the Septuagint version include Codex Vaticanus (B; $\mathfrak{G}$^{B}; 4th century), Codex Sinaiticus (S; BHK: $\mathfrak{G}$^{S}; 4th century), and Codex Alexandrinus (A; $\mathfrak{G}$^{A}; 5th century).

== Wise as serpents (2:1–8) ==
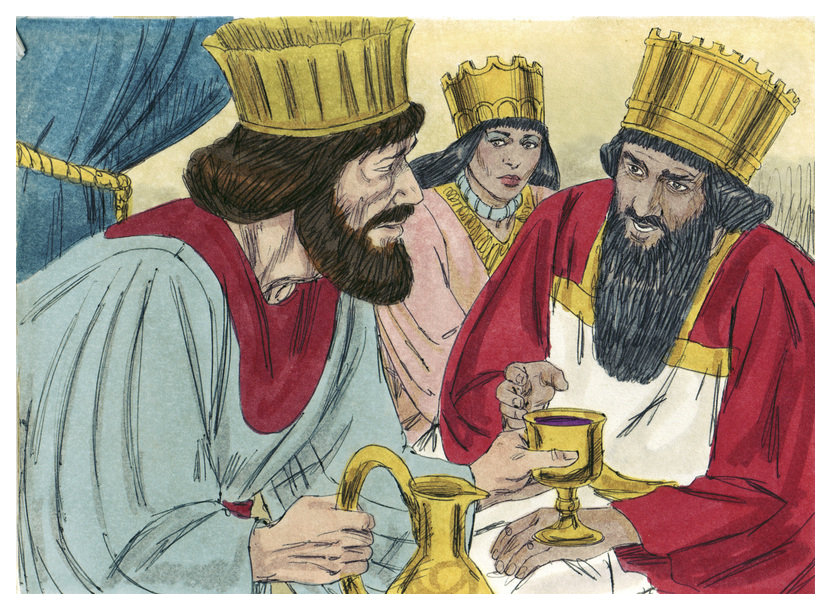
Nehemiah before the king Artaxerxes I. Illustration of Book of Nehemiah Chapter 2. Biblical illustrations by Jim Padgett

The scene of this part is the banqueting hall of King Artaxerxes, where Nehemiah carries out his duties as a cup-bearer. H. E. Ryle suggests that Nehemiah is the king's "favourite cup-bearer". Nehemiah is sad, and the king asks why. McConville argues that the display of a long face before the king shows three significant aspects of Nehemiah: courage, godliness and wisdom, which bear dire risk of his life (cf. Esther before Ahasuerus, Esther 4:11).

=== Verse 1 ===
And it came to pass in the month Nisan, in the twentieth year of Artaxerxes the king, that wine was before him: and I took up the wine, and gave it unto the king.
Now I had not been beforetime sad in his presence.

- "Nisan": While Ezra uses numbered months (the nomenclature of the Torah), Nehemiah uses 'Babylonian calendrical names'.
- "Artaxerxes": or "Artaxerxes Longimanus"

=== Verses 2–3 ===
^{2}So the king said to me, "Why is your face troubled though you do not seem sick? This is nothing but a troubled heart."
Then I became very much afraid ^{3} and said to the king, "May the king live forever! Why should not my face be troubled when the city, the place of my fathers' tombs, lies waste, and its gates have been destroyed by fire?"

- "Became very much afraid": Nehemiah is worried about offending the king, despite 'what sounds like comforting concern', because with Nehemiah functioning as the official wine-taster, 'the emperor might well be worried if Nehemiah looks sick'. Nonetheless, the king is happy to grant Nehemiah's requests (verse 8), as Nehemiah then was given letters and a military escort (verse 9) as well as materials for his journey to Jerusalem.

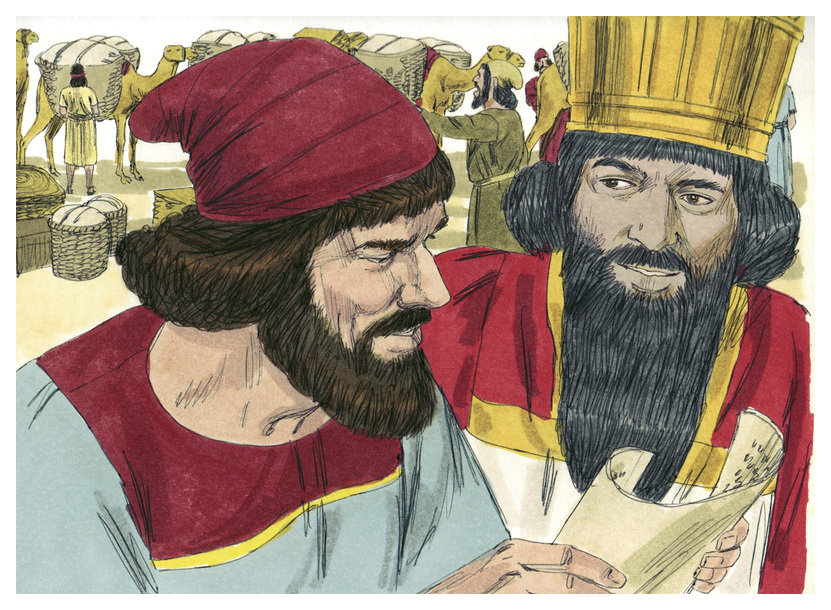
The king grants Nehemiah's requests. Illustration of Book of Nehemiah Chapter 2. Biblical illustrations by Jim Padgett

== Reconnaissance and Opposition (2:9–20) ==
This part describes Nehemiah's journey to Jerusalem, and his first actions when he arrived there, especially his preliminary reconnaissance of the walls at night, and the revelation of his plan to rebuild the walls of Jerusalem. The resentment from local people (verses 10–12) recalls Ezra 1–6.

=== Verse 9 ===
Then I came to the governors beyond the river, and gave them the king's letters. Now the king had sent captains of the army and horsemen with me.

The military escort given by the king to Nehemiah consisted of officers ("captains"; sārê), army (ḥayil), and cavalry ("horsemen"; pārāšîm). The evidence of Persian soldiers stationed in Judah is shown in the cist-type tombs which otherwise can only be found in Persian archaeological sites.

=== Verse 10 ===
When Sanballat the Horonite, and Tobiah the servant, the Ammonite, heard of it, it grieved them exceedingly that there was come a man to seek the welfare of the children of Israel.

- "Sanballat the Horonite": Smith-Christopher agrees with Blenkinsopp that "Horonite" here refers to Beth-Horon (Joshua 16:3, 5), northwest of Jerusalem, not the Horonaim of Moab (Isaiah 15:5; Jeremiah 48:3).

=== Verse 11 ===
So I came to Jerusalem, and was there three days.

- "Three days": The same "three days' interval" to 'rest after the journey and to prepare plans' is also used by Ezra (Ezra 8:32).

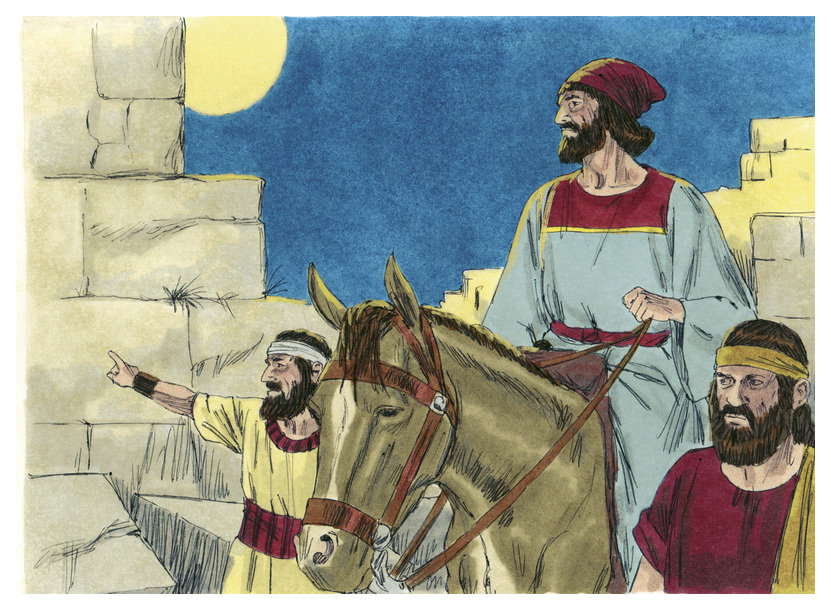
Nehemiah inspected the walls of Jerusalem at night. Biblical illustrations by Jim Padgett.

=== Verse 19 ===
But when Sanballat the Horonite, Tobiah the Ammonite subordinate, and Geshem the Arabian heard it, they laughed us to scorn, and despised us, and said, "What is this thing that you are doing? Are you rebelling against the king?"

- "Geshem the Arabian": another enemy of Nehemiah (beside Sanballat and Tobiah), who can be the same person as "Geshmu—King of Kedar", a name mentioned in a bowl from Ismalia, because "Kedar" is associated with "Arab" as in Genesis 25:13; Isaiah 21:16–17; 42:11; 60:7, also in Herodotus 3.4.88.

The three enemies geographically surrounded Nehemiah: Sanballat the Horonite to the north, Tobiah the Ammonite to the east, and Geshem ("Kedarites") to the south.

== Good versus evil ==
According to J. Gordon McConville, a conflict between good (tob) and evil (ra’) underlies the action of this chapter which is not immediately obvious in the English translation: Nehemiah's face is "sad" (verses 1–3) is actually described using the word "evil", which is also used for the word "trouble" of Jerusalem (verse 17, or in 1:3), whereas the expression "it pleased the king" (verses 6 & 7) is literally "it was good to the king", as also in "the good hand of God is upon Nehemiah" (verses 8, 18), or "the good work" (verse 18), which is simply "the good" (or "the good thing”"). Verse 10 shows most pointed contrast, where "it displeased them" is literally "it was evil to them", whereas "welfare" of the Jews is "their good". In this context, the king's decision and the rebuilding of the walls are "good", whereas the broken walls, Nehemiah's grief, or the conspiration of Sanballat, Tobiah and Geshem, are "evil".

== See also ==
- Artaxerxes I
- Jerusalem
- Related Bible parts: Ezra 7, Ezra 8

== Sources ==
- Fensham, F. Charles (1982). The Books of Ezra and Nehemiah. New international commentary on the Old Testament (illustrated ed.). Wm. B. Eerdmans Publishing. ISBN 978-0802825278.
- Grabbe, Lester L. (2003). "Nehemiah". In Dunn, James D. G.; Rogerson, John William (eds.). Eerdmans Commentary on the Bible (illustrated ed.). Wm. B. Eerdmans Publishing. pp. 320–328. ISBN 978-0802837110.
- Halley, Henry H. (1965). Halley's Bible Handbook: an abbreviated Bible commentary (24th (revised) ed.). Zondervan Publishing House. ISBN 0-310-25720-4.
- Larson, Knute; Dahlen, Kathy; Anders, Max E. (2005). Anders, Max E. (ed.). Holman Old Testament Commentary - Ezra, Nehemiah, Esther. Vol. 9 (illustrated ed.). B&H Publishing Group. ISBN 978-0805494693.
- Levering, Matthew (2007). Ezra & Nehemiah. Brazos Theological Commentary on the Bible. Brazos Press. ISBN 978-1587431616.
- McConville, J. G. (1985). Ezra, Nehemiah, and Esther. The daily study Bible : Old Testament. Westminster John Knox Press. ISBN 978-0664245832.
- Smith-Christopher, Daniel L. (2007). "15. Ezra-Nehemiah". In Barton, John; Muddiman, John (eds.). The Oxford Bible Commentary (first (paperback) ed.). Oxford University Press. pp. 308–324. ISBN 978-0199277186.
- Würthwein, Ernst (1995). The Text of the Old Testament. Translated by Rhodes, Erroll F. Grand Rapids, MI: Wm. B. Eerdmans. ISBN 0-8028-0788-7.
