= Nehemiah 1 =

Chapter from Nehemiah in the Old Testament

- ← Ezra 10 chapter 2 →
- Hebrew Bible, MS Sassoon 1053, images 485-513 (Ezra-Nehemiah).
- Book: Book of Nehemiah
- Category: Ketuvim
- Christian Bible part: Old Testament
- Order in the Christian part: 16

Nehemiah 1 is the first chapter of the Book of Nehemiah in the Old Testament of the Christian Bible, or the 11th chapter of the book of Ezra-Nehemiah in the Hebrew Bible, which treats the book of Ezra and the book of Nehemiah as one book. Jewish tradition states that Ezra is the author of Ezra-Nehemiah as well as the Book of Chronicles, but modern scholars generally accept that a compiler from the 5th century BCE (the so-called "Chronicler") is the final author of these books. This chapter describes Nehemiah's position in the Persian court and his piety.

== Text ==
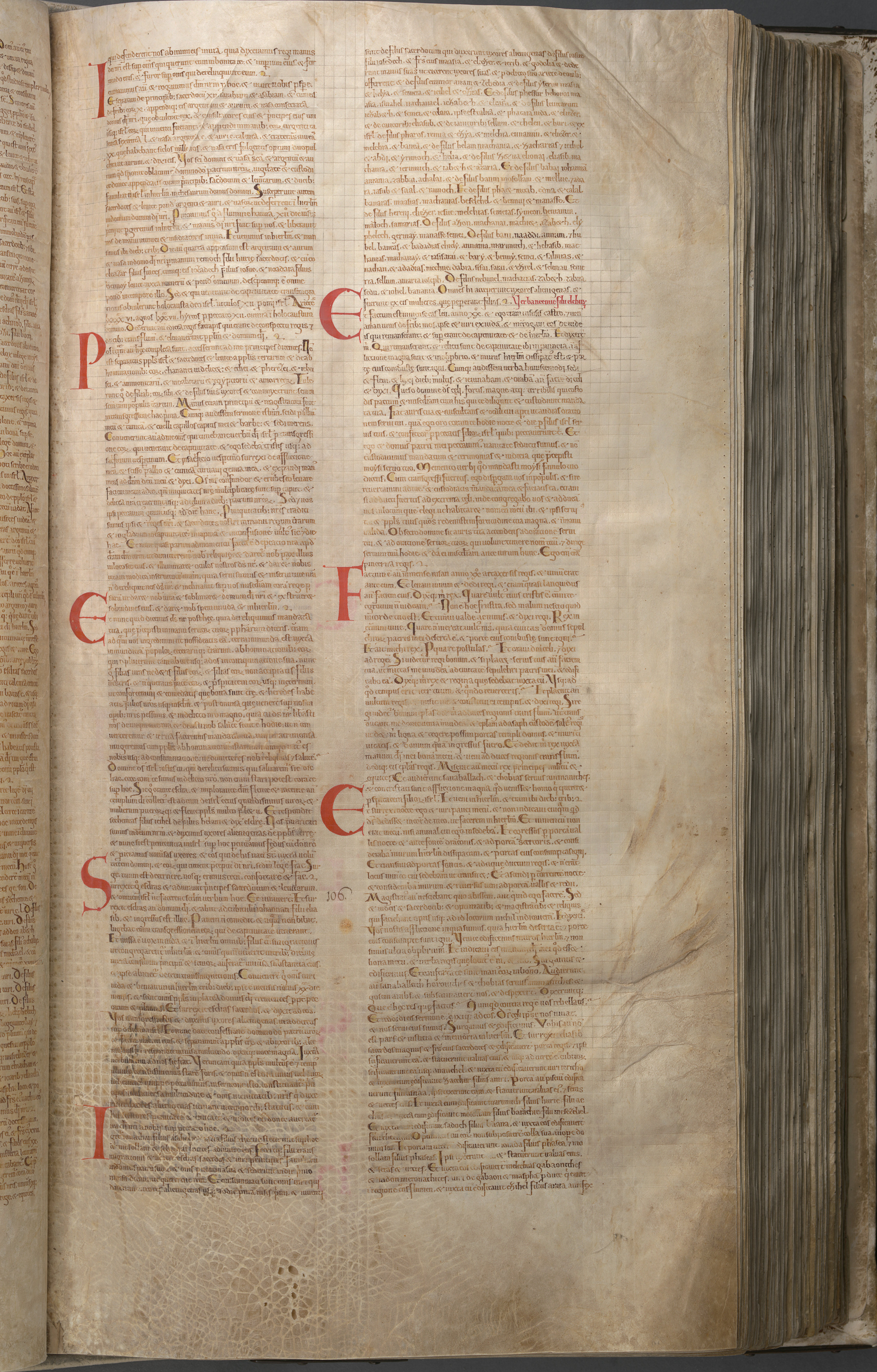
A page containing the Latin text of Ezra 8:22–10:44 (end) and Nehemiah 1:1–3:8 in the Codex Gigas (English: Giant Book), the largest extant medieval manuscript in the world (from 13th century).

This chapter is divided into 11 verses. The original text of this chapter is in Hebrew language.

=== Textual witnesses ===
Some early manuscripts containing the text of this chapter in Hebrew are of the Masoretic Text, which includes Codex Leningradensis (1008). (Note: Since 1947 the whole book of Ezra-Nehemiah has been missing from the text of the Aleppo Codex.)

There is also a translation into Koine Greek known as the Septuagint, made in the last few centuries BCE. Extant ancient manuscripts of the Septuagint version include Codex Vaticanus (B; $\mathfrak{G}$^{B}; 4th century), Codex Sinaiticus (S; BHK: $\mathfrak{G}$^{S}; 4th century), and Codex Alexandrinus (A; $\mathfrak{G}$^{A}; 5th century).

== The report (1:1–3) ==
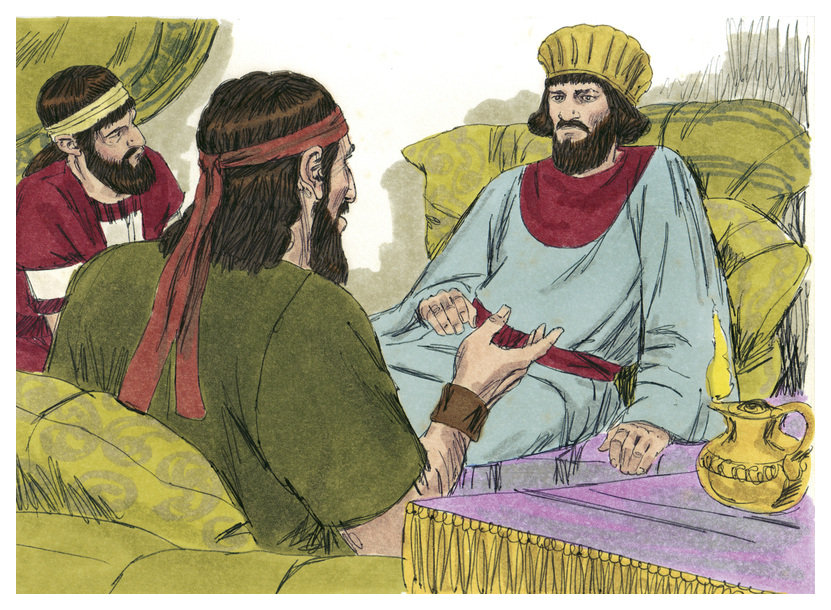
Nehemiah receiving reports about Jerusalem. Illustration of Book of Nehemiah Chapter 1, by Jim Padgett

This part opens the memoirs (chapter 1–8) of Nehemiah son of Hacaliah, who works in Persia as a court official but worries about the welfare of fellow Jews living in Jerusalem at the time. The first few verses of this chapter indicate the focus of the whole book of Nehemiah, starting by the introduction of the problem, that is, the "sad state of Jerusalem", followed by the solutions of this problem in the next chapters and the effects on the community in general.

=== Verse 1 ===
The words of Nehemiah the son of Hachaliah.
And it came to pass in the month Chisleu, in the twentieth year, as I was in Shushan the palace,

- "Chisleu (Kislev)": While Ezra uses numbered months (the nomenclature of the Torah), Nehemiah uses 'Babylonian calendrical names'.
- "The twentieth year": for the reign of Artaxerxes I corresponds to 445 BC, thirteen years after Ezra's arrival in Jerusalem.
- "Shushan" or "Susa" (Note: Note [a] on Nehemiah 1:1 in the NKJV)
- "Palace" (NKJV: “citadel"): or "fortified palace", also elsewhere in the book. (Note: Note [b] on Nehemiah 1:1 in the NKJV)

=== Verse 2 ===
That Hanani, one of my brethren, came, he and certain men of Judah; and I asked them concerning the Jews that had escaped, which were left of the captivity, and concerning Jerusalem.

- "Brethren": or "brothers", can be taken figuratively, but Williamson, noting Nehemiah 7:2, suggests to take this literally.

=== Verse 3 ===
And they said to me, "The survivors who are left from the captivity in the province are there in great distress and reproach. The wall of Jerusalem is also broken down, and its gates are burned with fire."

The news of the state of Jerusalem troubled Nehemiah partly because of the 'shame' (reproach; herpa) of this circumstance ("on taunts of foreigners", Psalm 69:20, 21; 71:13; 89:51; 119:22; Isaiah 51:7; Jeremiah 51:51; Lamentations 3:61; Zephaniah 2:8), but perhaps because he is surprised that 'the walls are still down, even after the temple has been rebuilt'.

== Nehemiah prays (1:4–11) ==
Nehemiah was passionate for the glory of God, so even while driven by empathy, before he formulated any plan, his first response was to pray to God. Eight times in his prayer, Nehemiah uses the term servant to refer himself, the Jewish people or Moses, also to begin and to close his prayer, showing his 'reverential submission' to God. Nehemiah's confession and petition reflects the whole Deuteronomic law, as he patterns his wordings after a condensed version of Deuteronomy 30 about God's curses and blessings, trusting God's promise to gather his people when they return to God. This prayer consists of five portions:

- (1) the opening address, Nehemiah 1:5
- (2) the humble approach, Nehemiah 1:6a
- (3) the confession of sins, Nehemiah 1:6b, 7
- (4) the appeal to the Divine Promise, Nehemiah 1:8–10
- (5) the closing supplication for (a) the people, and (b) Nehemiah as their representative at the royal court, Nehemiah 1:11.

There are similarities with the prayer of Ezra In particular, it has a close resemblance to the prayer of Daniel (Daniel 9:4–19), such as: the opening words in Nehemiah 1:5 are almost word for word the same as in Daniel 9:4, with the only variations being 'Adonai' for 'YHWH' and the additional title 'God of heaven'.

=== Verse 5 ===
and said:
"I beseech You, O Lord God of heaven, the great and awesome God, who keeps covenant and mercy for those who love Him and keep His commandments."

- "Keep": from the Hebrew verb Hebrew: שָׁמַר (shamar, "to observe; to keep") is often used as an idiom that means "to obey" the commandments of God (for examples, Exodus 20:6; Deuteronomy 5:16; 23:24; 29:8; Judges 2:22; 1 Kings 2:43; 11:11; Psalm 119:8, 17, 34; Jeremiah 35:18; Ezekiel 17:14; Amos 2:4). (Note: See BDB 1036 s.v. 3.c.) (Note: Note [b] on Nehemiah 1:5 in the NET Bible)

=== Verse 11 ===
"O Lord, I implore You, let Your ear be attentive to the prayer of Your servant, and to the prayer of Your servants who delight to revere Your name. And let Your servant prosper this day, and grant him mercy in the sight of this man."
For I was the king's cupbearer.

- "Cupbearer" (cf. Genesis 40:1; 41:9): considered by many scholars to mean "one who tasted wine for poison" (Xenophon. Cyropaedia. 1.3.9), but in the LXX (oinochoos in Alexandrinus and others) causes the rise of a variant that suggests Nehemiah was a "eunuch" (eunouchos) found only in Vaticanus, Sinaiticus, and Venetus, but rejected by most scholars. However, the arguments against Nehemiah's physical mutilation (as 'eunuch') 'tend to be motivated by the myth of Persian beneficence' Isaiah 56:4–5, and should not be dismissed lightly, as sociological studies indicate a possibility in tradition of Nehemiah as a eunuch.

== See also ==
- Artaxerxes I
- Jerusalem
- Related Bible parts:Deuteronomy 30

== Sources ==
- Fensham, F. Charles (1982). The Books of Ezra and Nehemiah. New international commentary on the Old Testament (illustrated ed.). Wm. B. Eerdmans Publishing. ISBN 978-0802825278.
- Grabbe, Lester L. (2003). "Nehemiah". In Dunn, James D. G.; Rogerson, John William (eds.). Eerdmans Commentary on the Bible (illustrated ed.). Wm. B. Eerdmans Publishing. pp. 320–328. ISBN 978-0802837110.
- Halley, Henry H. (1965). Halley's Bible Handbook: an abbreviated Bible commentary (24th (revised) ed.). Zondervan Publishing House. ISBN 0-310-25720-4.
- Larson, Knute; Dahlen, Kathy; Anders, Max E. (2005). Anders, Max E. (ed.). Holman Old Testament Commentary - Ezra, Nehemiah, Esther. Holman Old Testament commentary. Vol. 9 (illustrated ed.). B&H Publishing Group. ISBN 978-0805494693.
- Levering, Matthew (2007). Ezra & Nehemiah. Brazos Theological Commentary on the Bible. Brazos Press. ISBN 978-1587431616.
- McConville, J. G. (1985). Ezra, Nehemiah, and Esther. The daily study Bible : Old Testament. Westminster John Knox Press. ISBN 978-0664245832.
- Ryle, H E (1893). J J Stewart Perowne (ed.). Cambridge Bible for Schools and Colleges. Vol. Ezra and Nehemiah. Cambridge: University Press.
- Skehan, P. W. (2003), "Bible (Texts)", New Catholic Encyclopedia, vol. 2 (2nd ed.), Gale
- Smith-Christopher, Daniel L. (2007). "15. Ezra-Nehemiah". In Barton, John; Muddiman, John (eds.). The Oxford Bible Commentary (first (paperback) ed.). Oxford University Press. pp. 308–324. ISBN 978-0199277186.
- Williamson, Hugh Godfrey Maturin (1985). Ezra, Nehemiah. Word Biblical Commentary. Vol. 16. Word Books. ISBN 978-0-8499-0215-4.
- Würthwein, Ernst (1995). The Text of the Old Testament. Translated by Rhodes, Erroll F. Grand Rapids, MI: Wm. B. Eerdmans. ISBN 0-8028-0788-7.
