= Ezra 10 =

Chapter in the Book of Ezra

- ← chapter 9 Nehemiah 1 →
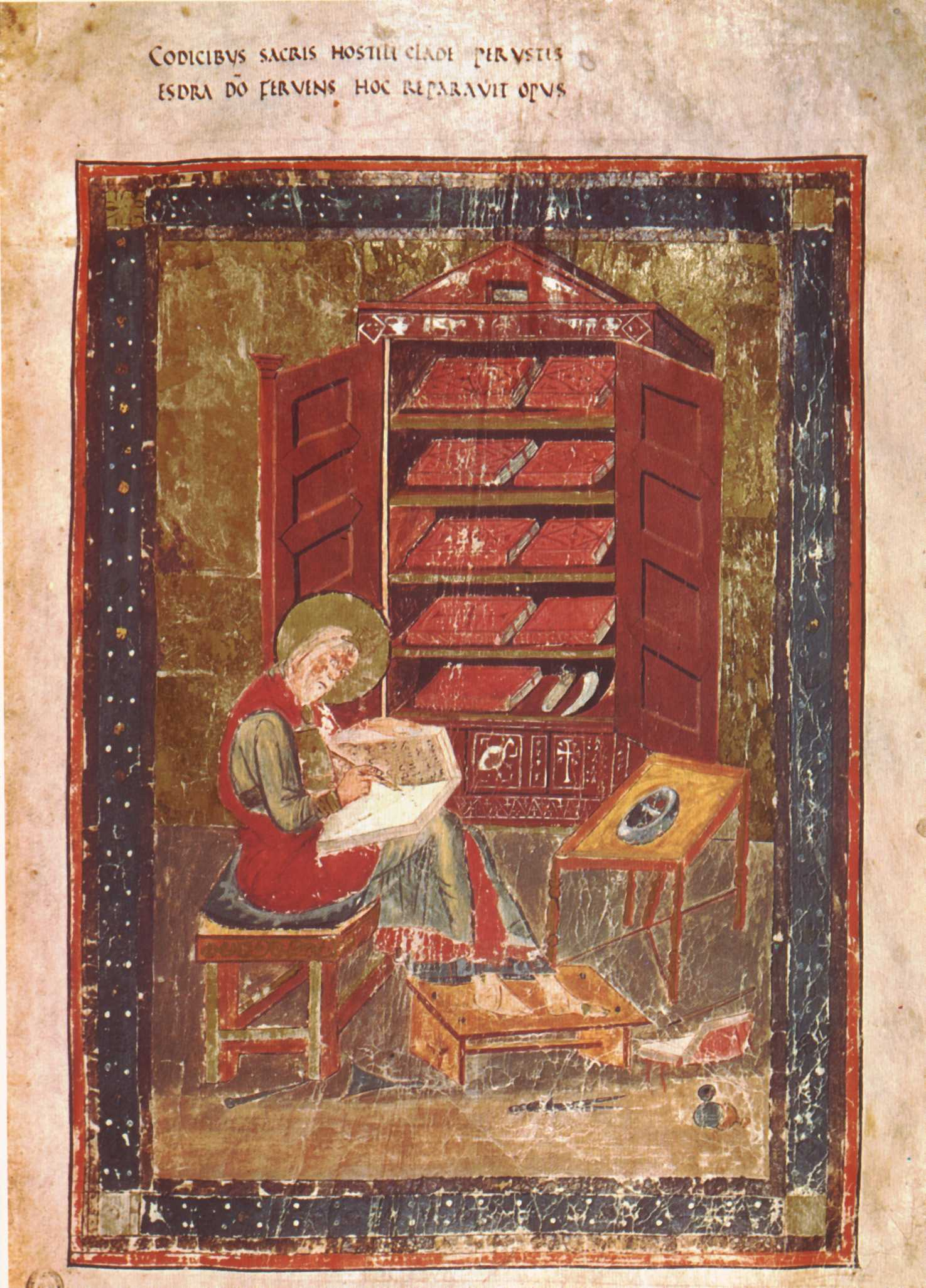
- Ezra the scribe. In: Folio 5r from the Codex Amiatinus (Florence, Biblioteca Medicea Laurenziana, MS Amiatinus 1)
- Book: Book of Ezra
- Category: Ketuvim
- Christian Bible part: Old Testament
- Order in the Christian part: 15

Ezra 10 is the tenth and final chapter of the Book of Ezra in the Old Testament of the Christian Bible, or the tenth chapter of the book of Ezra-Nehemiah in the Hebrew Bible, which treats the book of Ezra and book of Nehemiah as one book. Jewish tradition states that Ezra is the author of Ezra-Nehemiah as well as the Book of Chronicles, but modern scholars generally accept that a compiler from the 5th century BCE (the so-called "Chronicler") is the final author of these books. The section comprising chapters 7 to 10 mainly describes the activities of Ezra the scribe and the priest. This chapter and the previous one deal with the problem of intermarriage, especially the solution of it, ending with a list of those who sent away their "foreign" wives and children; a somber note which finds relief in the Book of Nehemiah, as the continuation of the Book of Ezra.

== Text ==
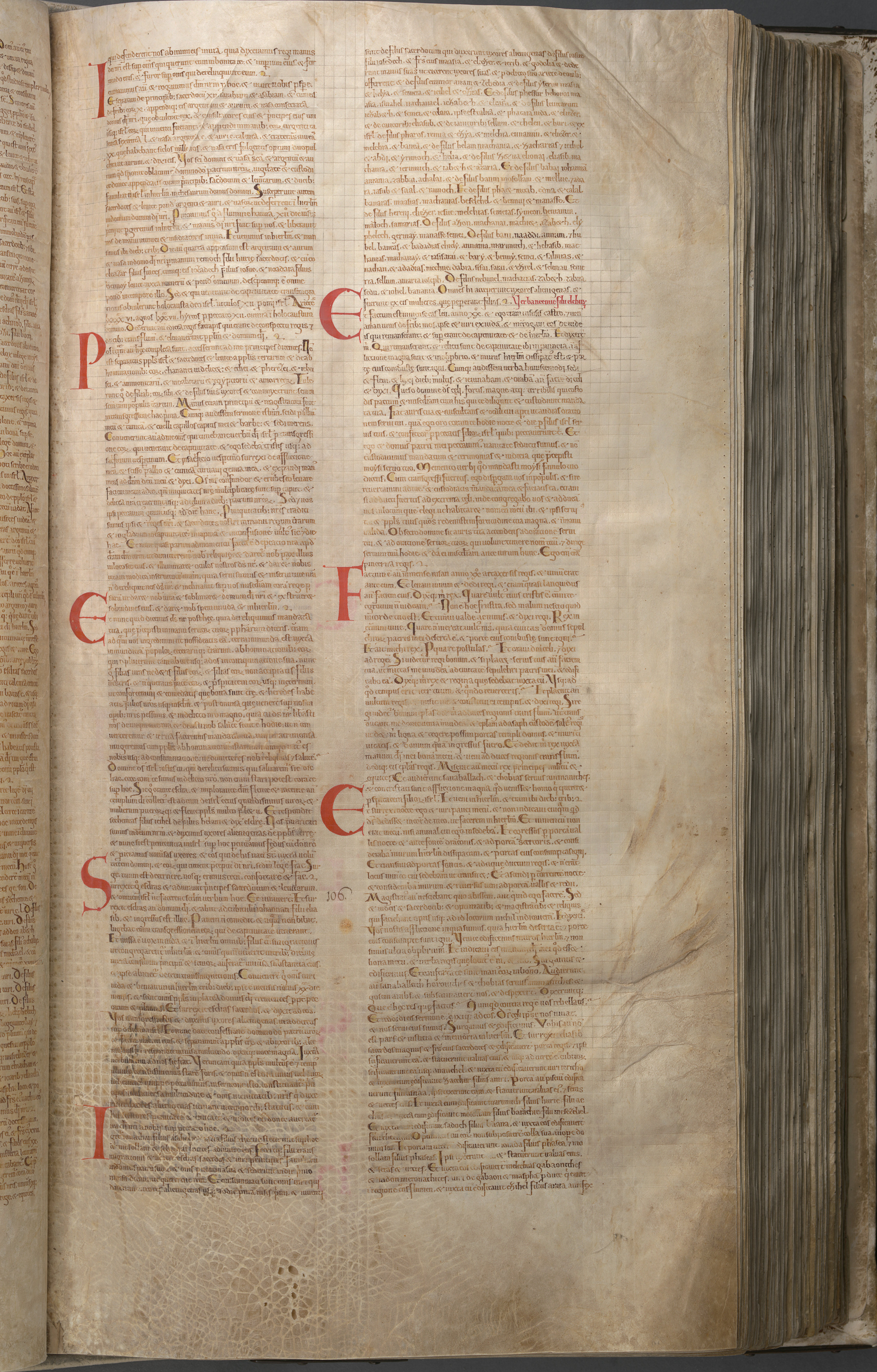
A page containing the Latin text of Ezra 8:22–10:44 (end) and Nehemiah 1:1–3:8 in the Codex Gigas (English: Giant Book), the largest extant medieval manuscript in the world (from 13th century).

This chapter is divided into 44 verses. The original text of this chapter is in Hebrew language.

=== Textual witnesses ===
Some early manuscripts containing the text of this chapter in Hebrew are of the Masoretic Text, which includes Codex Leningradensis (1008). (Note: Since 1947 the current text of Aleppo Codex is missing the whole book of Ezra-Nehemiah.)

There is also a translation into Koine Greek known as the Septuagint, made in the last few centuries BCE. Extant ancient manuscripts of the Septuagint version include Codex Sinaiticus (S; BHK: $\mathfrak{G}$^{S}; 4th century), Codex Vaticanus (B; $\mathfrak{G}$^{B}; 4th century), and Codex Alexandrinus (A; $\mathfrak{G}$^{A}; 5th century).

An ancient Greek book called 1 Esdras (Greek: Ἔσδρας Αʹ) containing some parts of 2 Chronicles, Ezra and Nehemiah is included in most editions of the Septuagint and is placed before the single book of Ezra–Nehemiah (which is titled in Greek: Ἔσδρας Βʹ). 1 Esdras 8:91-9:36 is equivalent to Ezra 10, recounting how the returned captives agreed to the putting away of their foreign wives and children.

== The consensus (verses 1–6) ==
Ezra's public humiliation and prayer attracted a group of people who joined him in "demonstrations of sorrow over the sins of Israel", and as a result, they made a consensus of the resolution.

=== Verse 1 ===
Now while Ezra was praying, and while he was confessing, weeping, and bowing down before the house of God, a very large assembly of men, women, and children gathered to him from Israel; for the people wept very bitterly.

The Hebrew shows that the people were assembling during Ezra's prayer. The Jerusalem Bible describes the prayer of Ezra as "also a sermon".

=== Verse 2 ===
And Shechaniah the son of Jehiel, one of the sons of Elam, spoke up and said to Ezra, “We have trespassed against our God, and have taken pagan wives from the peoples of the land; yet now there is hope in Israel in spite of this.

The people acknowledged that they been unfaithful to God, in breach of the law. The laws to which Ezra must have referred would have been those found in Exodus 23:31–33, Exodus 34:12–16 and Deuteronomy 7:1–5. These passages contain prohibitions, very similar in character, directed against intermarriage with the nations that dwelt in Canaan, on the ground that such marriages would inevitably lead to idolatry and to the abominations connected with idolatrous worship.

=== Verse 5 ===
Then Ezra arose, and made the leaders of the priests, the Levites, and all Israel swear an oath that they would do according to this word. So they swore an oath.

Although Ezra has been given Persian authority, his choice of action to make the leaders, priests, Levites, and all Israel "swear an oath" to abide by a covenantal agreement reflects "internal politics", in contrast to Nehemiah, who prefers 'to command and order'.

== The assembly (verses 7–15) ==
The whole community was assembled "in the street of the house of God" to "confront the intermarriage issue and to decide on the divorce proposal".

== The commission (verses 16–17) ==
Following the majority opinion, Ezra appointed a commission by selecting 'men who were family heads' to form the official investigation of the intermarriage cases.

== The guilty (verses 18–44) ==
After the results of the commission's investigation were announced, an official list was created to record "those found guilty of marrying pagan women".

== See also ==
- Jerusalem
- Levites
- Related Bible parts:Ezra 8, Ezra 9, Nehemiah 8

== Sources ==
- Fensham, F. Charles (1982). The Books of Ezra and Nehemiah. New international commentary on the Old Testament (illustrated ed.). Wm. B. Eerdmans Publishing. ISBN 978-0802825278.
- Grabbe, Lester L. (2003). "Ezra". In Dunn, James D. G.; Rogerson, John William (eds.). Eerdmans Commentary on the Bible (illustrated ed.). Wm. B. Eerdmans Publishing. pp. 313–319. ISBN 978-0802837110.
- Halley, Henry H. (1965). Halley's Bible Handbook: an abbreviated Bible commentary (24th (revised) ed.). Zondervan Publishing House. ISBN 0-310-25720-4.
- Larson, Knute; Dahlen, Kathy; Anders, Max E. (2005). Anders, Max E. (ed.). Holman Old Testament Commentary - Ezra, Nehemiah, Esther. Vol. 9 (illustrated ed.). B&H Publishing Group. ISBN 978-0805494693.
- Levering, Matthew (2007). Ezra & Nehemiah. Brazos Theological Commentary on the Bible. Brazos Press. ISBN 978-1587431616.
- McConville, J. G. (1985). Ezra, Nehemiah, and Esther. The daily study Bible : Old Testament. Westminster John Knox Press. ISBN 978-0664245832.
- Smith-Christopher, Daniel L. (2007). "15. Ezra-Nehemiah". In Barton, John; Muddiman, John (eds.). The Oxford Bible Commentary (first (paperback) ed.). Oxford University Press. pp. 308–324. ISBN 978-0199277186.
- Würthwein, Ernst (1995). The Text of the Old Testament. Translated by Rhodes, Erroll F. Grand Rapids, MI: Wm. B. Eerdmans. ISBN 0-8028-0788-7.
