= Ezra 9 =

Chapter in the Book of Ezra

- ← chapter 8 chapter 10 →
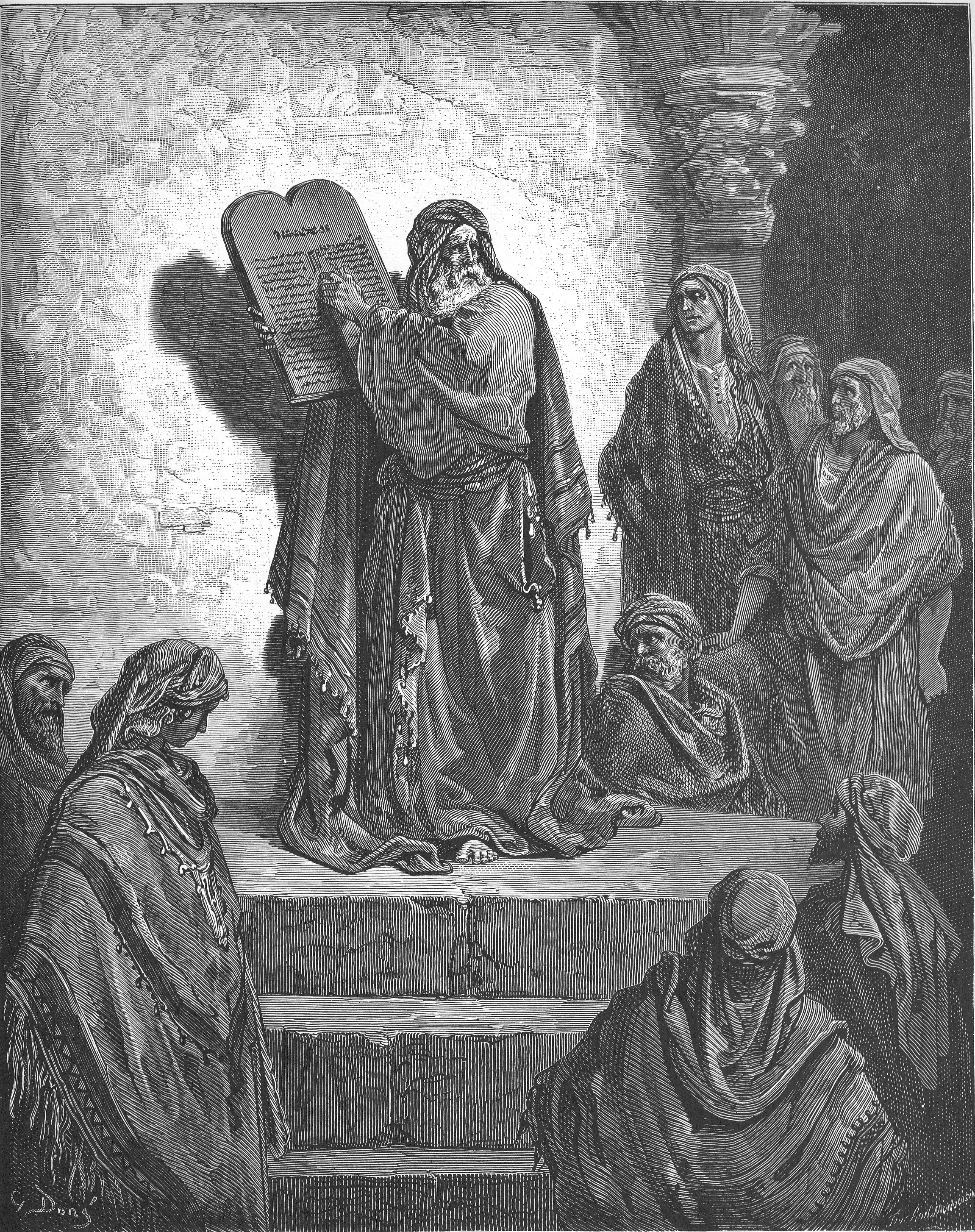
- "Ezra Reads the Law to the People", one of Gustave Doré's illustrations for La Grande Bible de Tours
- Book: Book of Ezra
- Category: Ketuvim
- Christian Bible part: Old Testament
- Order in the Christian part: 15

Ezra 9 is the ninth chapter of the Book of Ezra in the Old Testament of the Christian Bible, or the book of Ezra-Nehemiah in the Hebrew Bible, which treats the book of Ezra and book of Nehemiah as one book. Jewish tradition states that Ezra is the author of Ezra-Nehemiah as well as the Book of Chronicles, but modern scholars generally accept that a compiler from the 5th century BCE (the so-called "Chronicler") is the final author of these books. The section comprising chapters 7 to 10 mainly describes the activities of Ezra the scribe and the priest. This chapter and the next deal with the problem of intermarriage, starting with the introduction of the crisis, then Ezra's public mourning and prayer of shame. J. Gordon McConville suggests that this chapter is central to the Book of Ezra because it draws a sharp contrast between what the people of God ought to be and what they actually are.

== Text ==
This chapter is divided into 15 verses. The original text of this chapter is in Hebrew language.

=== Textual witnesses ===
Some early manuscripts containing the text of this chapter in Hebrew are of the Masoretic Text, which includes Codex Leningradensis (1008). (Note: Since the 1947 anti-Jewish riots in Aleppo the current text of Aleppo Codex is missing the whole book of Ezra-Nehemiah.)

There is also a translation into Koine Greek known as the Septuagint, made in the last few centuries BCE. Extant ancient manuscripts of the Septuagint version include Codex Sinaiticus (S; BHK: $\mathfrak{G}$^{S}; 4th century; only Ezra 9:9 to end), Codex Vaticanus (B; $\mathfrak{G}$^{B}; 4th century), and Codex Alexandrinus (A; $\mathfrak{G}$^{A}; 5th century).

An ancient Greek book called 1 Esdras (Greek: Ἔσδρας Αʹ), containing some parts of 2 Chronicles, Ezra and Nehemiah, is included in most editions of the Septuagint and is placed before the single book of Ezra–Nehemiah (which is titled in Greek: Ἔσδρας Βʹ). 1 Esdras 8:68-90 is equivalent to Ezra 9, dealing with the resettled community's repentance for entering into mixed marriages.

== The report (verses 1–2) ==
Some Jewish leaders in Jerusalem reported to Ezra about 'the misconduct of various leaders and members of the community'.

=== Verse 1 ===
After these things had been done, the leaders came to me and said, "The people of Israel, including the priests and the Levites, have not kept themselves separate from the neighboring peoples with their detestable practices, like those of the Canaanites, Hittites, Perizzites, Jebusites, Ammonites, Moabites, Egyptians and Amorites."

This verse lists the origins of the mixed marriage partners as Canaanites, Hittites, Perizzites, Jebusites, Ammonites, Moabites, Egyptians and Amorites. It is not clear how much time had elapsed between the celebrations in Ezra 8:35 and this incident. H. E. Ryle offers "two dates ... by which we can conjecture the length of the interval":

- the sacred gifts had been handed over to the care of the priests and Levites on the 4th day of the fifth month, see Ezra 7:8 and Ezra 8:33;
- the summons for the general assembly, convened to enquire into the people's sin, was sent out on the 27th date of the ninth month.

=== Verse 2 ===
"For they have taken some of their daughters as wives for themselves and their sons, so that the holy seed is mixed with the peoples of those lands. Indeed, the hand of the leaders and rulers has been foremost in this trespass."

- "The peoples of those lands": are associated with ṯō-‘ă-ḇōṯ ("abominations"), which is "the most common cultic term for idolatrous practices", and also denoting the "objectionable actions and behavior".

== The response (verses 3–5) ==
Hearing the report, Ezra responded with a "public act of contrition" in his function as "the official representative of the community".

=== Verse 3 ===
And when I heard this thing, I rent my garment and my mantle, and plucked off the hair of my head and of my beard, and sat down astonied.

- "Rent my garment and my mantle": Here Ezra is rending (tearing) his 'under-garment' or 'tunic' (Hebrew begedh) and the 'long loose robe' (Hebrew: m‘îl) that he was wearing. The act of rending one's clothes is frequently mentioned in the Hebrew Bible as a sign of grief, such as:
- Reuben rent his 'clothes' (plural of begedh) on not finding Joseph (Genesis 37:29)
- Jacob rent his 'garments' (plural of simlah) on seeing Joseph's blood-stained coat (Genesis 37:34)
- Joseph's brethren rent their clothes (plural of simlah) when the cup was found in Benjamin's sack (Genesis 44:13)
- Joshua rent his 'clothes' (plural of simlah) after the repulse at Ai (Joshua 7:6)
- Jephthah rent his 'clothes' (plural of begedh) on meeting his daughter (Judges 11:35)
- the messenger from the field of Ziklag came with his clothes (plural of begedh) rent (2 Samuel 1:2, cf. 1 Samuel 4:12)
- Job rent his mantle (m‘îl) on hearing of his children's death (Job 1:20)
- Job's friends rent their mantle (‘m‘îl’) when they came to visit him (Job 2:12).

The action also denoted 'horror' on receiving shocking intelligence or hearing shocking words, such as:

- Hezekiah and his ministers rent their clothes (plural of begedh) after Rabshakeh's speech (2 Kings 18:37; 2 Kings 19:1)
- Mordecai rent his clothes (plural of begedh) on hearing of Haman's determination (Esther 4:1)
- See also Isaiah 36:22; Jeremiah 41:5; 2 Chronicles 34:27.

In the New Testament is also recorded:

- the High-priest rent his garments on hearing the testimony of Jesus (Matthew 26:65).

== The prayer (verses 6–15) ==
Being a leader of the community, Ezra offered a "public prayer of confession" which is "sincere, personal, emotional and forthright". The Jerusalem Bible describes the prayer of Ezra as "also a sermon".

== See also ==
- Ammonites
- Amorites
- Canaanites
- Egyptians
- Hittites
- Jebusites
- Jerusalem
- Moabites
- Perizzites
- Related Bible parts:Ezra 8, Ezra 10, Nehemiah 8

== Sources ==
- Fensham, F. Charles (1982). The Books of Ezra and Nehemiah. New international commentary on the Old Testament (illustrated ed.). Wm. B. Eerdmans Publishing. ISBN 978-0802825278.
- Grabbe, Lester L. (2003). "Ezra". In Dunn, James D. G.; Rogerson, John William (eds.). Eerdmans Commentary on the Bible (illustrated ed.). Wm. B. Eerdmans Publishing. pp. 313–319. ISBN 978-0802837110.
- Halley, Henry H. (1965). Halley's Bible Handbook: an abbreviated Bible commentary (24th (revised) ed.). Zondervan Publishing House. ISBN 0-310-25720-4.
- Larson, Knute; Dahlen, Kathy; Anders, Max E. (2005). Anders, Max E. (ed.). Holman Old Testament Commentary - Ezra, Nehemiah, Esther. Holman Old Testament commentary. Vol. 9 (illustrated ed.). B&H Publishing Group. ISBN 978-0805494693.
- Levering, Matthew (2007). Ezra & Nehemiah. Brazos Theological Commentary on the Bible. Brazos Press. ISBN 978-1587431616.
- McConville, J. G. (1985). Ezra, Nehemiah, and Esther. The daily study Bible : Old Testament. Westminster John Knox Press. ISBN 978-0664245832.
- Smith-Christopher, Daniel L. (2007). "15. Ezra-Nehemiah". In Barton, John; Muddiman, John (eds.). The Oxford Bible Commentary (first (paperback) ed.). Oxford University Press. pp. 308–324. ISBN 978-0199277186.
- Würthwein, Ernst (1995). The Text of the Old Testament. Translated by Rhodes, Erroll F. Grand Rapids, MI: Wm. B. Eerdmans. ISBN 0-8028-0788-7.
