= Nehemiah 8 =

Chapter in the Old Testament Book of Nehemiah

- ← chapter 7 chapter 9 →
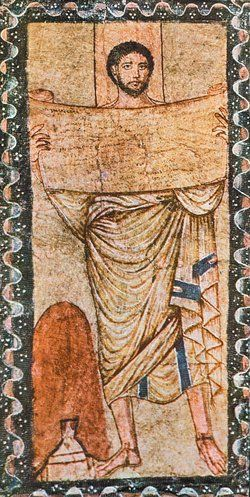
- Ezra Reads the Law; Synagogue interior wood panel. Location: Dura-Europos, Syria.
- Book: Book of Nehemiah
- Category: Ketuvim
- Christian Bible part: Old Testament
- Order in the Christian part: 16

Nehemiah 8 is the eighth chapter of the Book of Nehemiah in the Old Testament of the Christian Bible, or the 18th chapter of the book of Ezra–Nehemiah in the Hebrew Bible, which treats the book of Ezra and the book of Nehemiah as one book. Jewish tradition states that Ezra is the author of Ezra-Nehemiah as well as the Book of Chronicles, but modern scholars generally accept that a compiler from the 5th century BCE (the so-called "Chronicler") is the final author of these books. This chapter and the next recount the reading of the law by Ezra, "the scribe" and "the priest", and the popular response. Nehemiah the governor is also briefly mentioned. The community then went on to celebrate the Feast of Tabernacles with great joy.

== Text ==
The original text of this chapter is in Hebrew language. This chapter is divided into 18 verses. Daniel Smith-Christopher argues that "the presence of Ezra and the virtual absence of Nehemiah support the argument that chapter 8 is among [several] displaced chapters from the Ezra material", and suggests that "the original place for [this chapter] would logically have been between Ezra 8 and 9".

=== Textual witnesses ===
Some early manuscripts containing the text of this chapter in Hebrew are of the Masoretic Text, which includes Codex Leningradensis (1008). (Note: Since the anti-Jewish riots in Aleppo in 1947, the whole book of Ezra-Nehemiah has been missing from the text of the Aleppo Codex.)

There is also a translation into Koine Greek known as the Septuagint, made in the last few centuries BCE. Extant ancient manuscripts of the Septuagint version include Codex Vaticanus (B; $\mathfrak{G}$^{B}; 4th century), Codex Sinaiticus (S; BHK: $\mathfrak{G}$^{S}; 4th century), and Codex Alexandrinus (A; $\mathfrak{G}$^{A}; 5th century).

An ancient Greek book called 1 Esdras (Greek: Ἔσδρας Αʹ), containing some parts of 2 Chronicles, Ezra and Nehemiah is included in most editions of the Septuagint and is placed before the single book of Ezra–Nehemiah (which is titled in Greek: Ἔσδρας Βʹ). 1 Esdras 9:37-55 is an equivalent of Nehemiah 7:73-8:12 (The reading of the Law).

== Ezra reads the law (8:1–12) ==
The commission given to Ezra was to 'restructure the Jewish community' under God's laws, so he read and instructed the people who gathered around in 'the commands and intentions of God's revelation'.

=== Verse 1 ===
And all the people gathered themselves together as one man into the street that was before the water gate; and they spake unto Ezra the scribe to bring the book of the law of Moses, which the Lord had commanded to Israel.

- "They spake unto Ezra": the initiative to hear the book of the law of God (Torah) came from the people.

Ezra is described as "the scribe" in this verse and as "the priest" in verse 2. Repairs to "the place in front of the Water Gate toward the east" were referred to in Nehemiah 3:26. Whereas the King James Version refers to the "street" before the gate, other translations refer to the "square" or the "courtyard". In the Vulgate the closing words of Nehemiah 7:73, When the seventh month came, the children of Israel were in their cities form the opening words of Nehemiah 8:1: see also Nehemiah 8:1 in the Douay–Rheims Bible.

=== Verse 3 ===
Then he (Ezra) read from it (the Law) in the open square that was in front of the Water Gate from morning until midday, before the men and women and those who could understand; and the ears of all the people were attentive to the Book of the Law.

Ezra's actions recall those of King Josiah in 2 Kings 23:2:

The king went up to the house of the Lord with all the men of Judah, and with him all the inhabitants of Jerusalem — the priests and the prophets and all the people, both small and great. And he read in their hearing all the words of the Book of the Covenant which had been found in the house of the Lord.

== The Feast of Tabernacles (8:13–18) ==
The requirements of God's laws were founded on God's grace and the intention behind the Feast of Tabernacles was to commemorate God's miraculous deliverance of Israel. The celebration closely followed the regulation in Leviticus 23.

=== Verse 17 ===
So the whole assembly of those who had returned from the captivity made booths and sat under the booths; for since the days of Joshua the son of Nun until that day the children of Israel had not done so. And there was very great gladness.

- "Booths": or "temporary shelters".
- "Until that day the children of Israel has not done so": Although the Israelites had regularly celebrated the Feast of Tabernacles, the festival had gradually become a 'harvest celebration', but in Ezra's time the festival was 'to commemorate God's grace' just as intended in Leviticus 23:43.

== See also ==
- Jerusalem
- Sukkot
- Related Bible parts: Ezra 3, Ezra 7

== Sources ==
- Fensham, F. Charles (1982). The Books of Ezra and Nehemiah. New international commentary on the Old Testament (illustrated ed.). Wm. B. Eerdmans Publishing. ISBN 978-0802825278.
- Grabbe, Lester L. (2003). "Nehemiah". In Dunn, James D. G.; Rogerson, John William (eds.). Eerdmans Commentary on the Bible (illustrated ed.). Wm. B. Eerdmans Publishing. pp. 320–328. ISBN 978-0802837110.
- Halley, Henry H. (1965). Halley's Bible Handbook: an abbreviated Bible commentary (24th (revised) ed.). Zondervan Publishing House. ISBN 0-310-25720-4.
- Larson, Knute; Dahlen, Kathy; Anders, Max E. (2005). Anders, Max E. (ed.). Holman Old Testament Commentary - Ezra, Nehemiah, Esther. Holman Old Testament commentary. Vol. 9 (illustrated ed.). B&H Publishing Group. ISBN 978-0805494693.
- Levering, Matthew (2007). Ezra & Nehemiah. Brazos Theological Commentary on the Bible. Brazos Press. ISBN 978-1587431616.
- McConville, J. G. (1985). Ezra, Nehemiah, and Esther. The daily study Bible : Old Testament. Westminster John Knox Press. ISBN 978-0664245832.
- Smith-Christopher, Daniel L. (2007). "15. Ezra-Nehemiah". In Barton, John; Muddiman, John (eds.). The Oxford Bible Commentary (first (paperback) ed.). Oxford University Press. pp. 308–324. ISBN 978-0199277186.
- Würthwein, Ernst (1995). The Text of the Old Testament. Translated by Rhodes, Erroll F. Grand Rapids, MI: Wm. B. Eerdmans. ISBN 0-8028-0788-7.
