= Ezra 7 =

Chapter in the Book of Ezra

- ← chapter 6 chapter 8 →
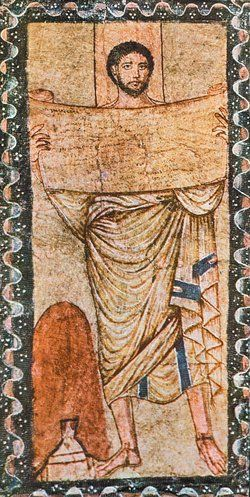
- Ezra Reads the Law; Synagogue interior wood panel. Location: Dura Europos, Syria.
- Book: Book of Ezra
- Category: Ketuvim
- Christian Bible part: Old Testament
- Order in the Christian part: 15

Ezra 7 is the seventh chapter of the Book of Ezra in the Old Testament of the Christian Bible, or the book of Ezra–Nehemiah in the Hebrew Bible, which treats the book of Ezra and book of Nehemiah as one book. Jewish tradition states that Ezra is the author of Ezra–Nehemiah as well as the Book of Chronicles, but modern scholars generally accept that a compiler from the 5th century BCE (the so-called "Chronicler") is the final author of these books. The section comprising chapters 7 to 10 mainly describes the activities of Ezra the scribe and the priest. This chapter focuses on the commission of Ezra by Artaxerxes I of Persia, and the start of his journey from Babylon to Jerusalem.

== Text ==
This chapter is divided into 28 verses. The original text of verses 1–11 is in Hebrew language, verses 12–26 are in Aramaic, and verses 27–28 are in Hebrew again.

=== Textual witnesses ===
Some early manuscripts containing the text of this chapter in Hebrew/Aramaic are of the Masoretic Text, which includes Codex Leningradensis (1008). (Note: Since 1947 the current text of Aleppo Codex is missing the whole book of Ezra-Nehemiah.)

There is also a translation into Koine Greek known as the Septuagint, made in the last few centuries BCE. Extant ancient manuscripts of the Septuagint version include Codex Vaticanus (B; $\mathfrak{G}$^{B}; 4th century), and Codex Alexandrinus (A; $\mathfrak{G}$^{A}; 5th century). (Note: The extant Codex Sinaiticus only contains Ezra 9:9–10:44.)

An ancient Greek book called 1 Esdras (Greek: Ἔσδρας Αʹ) containing some parts of 2 Chronicles, Ezra and Nehemiah is included in most editions of the Septuagint and is placed before the single book of Ezra–Nehemiah (which is titled in Greek: Ἔσδρας Βʹ). 1 Esdras 8:1–27 is an equivalent of Ezra 7 (In Artaxerxes' reign).

== Ezra the man and the mission (7:1–10) ==
This part introduces Ezra, a priest and devout teacher of the Mosaic Law, the leader of another group of Jews leaving Babylonia for Jerusalem during the reign of Artaxerxes the king of Persia, thereby skipping almost sixty years of history about the remaining years of Darius and the entire reign of Xerxes. Ezra's priestly heritage (verses 1–5, cf. 1 Chronicles 6) connects him to the great priests in history (ultimately to Phinehas, Eleazar, and Aaron the high priests) to validate his authority, before presenting his devotion and integrity (verse 6). Verses 7–10 contains the summary of Ezra's journey.

=== Verses 1–6 ===
^{1} Now after these things, in the reign of Artaxerxes king of Persia, Ezra the son of Seraiah, the son of Azariah, the son of Hilkiah, ^{2} the son of Shallum, the son of Zadok, the son of Ahitub, ^{3} the son of Amariah, the son of Azariah, the son of Meraioth, ^{4} the son of Zerahiah, the son of Uzzi, the son of Bukki, ^{5} the son of Abishua, the son of Phinehas, the son of Eleazar, the son of Aaron the high priest— ^{6} this Ezra went up from Babylon. He was a scribe skilled in the Law of Moses, given by the Lord God of Israel. Because the hand of the Lord his God was upon him, the king granted him all his requests.

- "A scribe": Ezra was a "teacher" well versed in the Law of Moses, which was given by "the LORD, the God of Israel". The term "teacher" can also translate as "scribe", denoting "a person skilled in the study, practice, and teaching of the Torah". This position gained importance in the postexilic community and increased in influence through the time of Jesus. Ezra's highest commendation was that he was a skilled student of the Pentateuch and an effective teacher of its laws, therefore he was commissioned because the Persian government sought to solidify Jerusalem and Judea as a temple state, but for the Jews his arrival is "the next essential step" to follow the completion of the temple with the establishment of "religions purity as prescribed by the Mosaic Law". The king had granted Ezra everything he asked, although it remains uncertain what was requested, but the statement indicates the high regard in which he was held by the Persian court. Nonetheless, 'the ultimate determination of blessing and judgment rested with God'.

=== Verse 7 ===
And there went up some of the children of Israel, and of the priests, and the Levites, and the singers, and the porters, and the Nethinims, unto Jerusalem, in the seventh year of Artaxerxes the king.

- "Nethinim": A class subordinate to the Levites mentioned in the books of Ezra and Nehemiah (Ezra 2:43; 2:58; 2:70; 7:24; 8:17; 8:20; Nehemiah 3:26; 3:31; 7:46; 7:60; 7:73; 10:28; 11:3; 11:21) and only once elsewhere (1 Chronicles 9:2); ranking before "the servants of Solomon" (Ezra 2:55) in the services of the Temple. The name denotes "given" and Jewish tradition identified them mainly with the Gibeonites, who had been assigned by Joshua to the Levites to assist them in the discharge of the more menial tasks (Joshua 9:3–27).
- "The seventh year of Artaxerxes": corresponds to 458 BC.

=== Verse 8 ===
And he came to Jerusalem in the fifth month, which was in the seventh year of the king.

- "The fifth month": the month Ab (Assyrian: Abu), corresponds to the month August.

=== Verse 9 ===
For upon the first day of the first month began he to go up from Babylon, and on the first day of the fifth month came he to Jerusalem, according to the good hand of his God upon him.

Ezra had determined to depart ("go up") on the first day of the first month (Nisan; Assyrian: Nisanu; part of March and April), but the rendezvous with his group apparently took place on the 9th day of the same month, and the journey actually commenced on the 12th day (cf. Ezra 8:15, 31), lasted throughout 18 days of Nisan, and the three months Iyyar, Sivan, and Tammuz; in all about 108 days. The straightline distance from Babylon to Jerusalem is over 500 miles, but following traditional route, Ezra's caravan should make a long detour by Carchemish to avoid the desert area, so the total journey could hardly have been less than 900 miles (cf. Ezra 8:32).

== The King's Commission (7:11–26) ==
This part, written in Aramaic, records how Artaxerxes, the king of Persia, provided Ezra with 'a letter of commission, authorization, and support as well as limitations' for his journey and mission to Jerusalem.

=== Verse 12 ===
Artaxerxes, king of kings,
To Ezra the priest, a scribe of the Law of the God of heaven:

Perfect peace, and so forth.

- "Perfect peace": from Aramaic: גמיר, gə-mîr; probably a greeting.
- "And so forth" from Aramaic: וכענת, ū-ḵə-‘e-neṯ.

== Ezra's Praise (7:27–28) ==
The last two verses (in Hebrew) are Ezra's own memoirs where he praised God's provision, care, and goodness, that became his source of courage for the journey ahead.

== See also ==
- Artaxerxes I
- Jerusalem
- Related Bible parts:1 Chronicles 6, Nehemiah 8

== Sources ==
- Fensham, F. Charles (1982). The Books of Ezra and Nehemiah. New international commentary on the Old Testament (illustrated ed.). Wm. B. Eerdmans Publishing. ISBN 978-0802825278.
- Grabbe, Lester L. (2003). "Ezra". In Dunn, James D. G.; Rogerson, John William (eds.). Eerdmans Commentary on the Bible (illustrated ed.). Wm. B. Eerdmans Publishing. pp. 313–319. ISBN 978-0802837110.
- Halley, Henry H. (1965). Halley's Bible Handbook: an abbreviated Bible commentary (24th (revised) ed.). Zondervan Publishing House. ISBN 0-310-25720-4.
- Larson, Knute; Dahlen, Kathy; Anders, Max E. (2005). Anders, Max E. (ed.). Holman Old Testament Commentary - Ezra, Nehemiah, Esther. Vol. 9 (illustrated ed.). B&H Publishing Group. ISBN 978-0805494693.
- Levering, Matthew (2007). Ezra & Nehemiah. Brazos Theological Commentary on the Bible. Brazos Press. ISBN 978-1587431616.
- McConville, J. G. (1985). Ezra, Nehemiah, and Esther. The daily study Bible : Old Testament. Westminster John Knox Press. ISBN 978-0664245832.
- Smith-Christopher, Daniel L. (2007). "15. Ezra-Nehemiah". In Barton, John; Muddiman, John (eds.). The Oxford Bible Commentary (first (paperback) ed.). Oxford University Press. pp. 308–324. ISBN 978-0199277186.
- Würthwein, Ernst (1995). The Text of the Old Testament. Translated by Rhodes, Erroll F. Grand Rapids, MI: Wm. B. Eerdmans. ISBN 0-8028-0788-7.
