= Abraham and Lot's conflict =

Old Testament occurrence

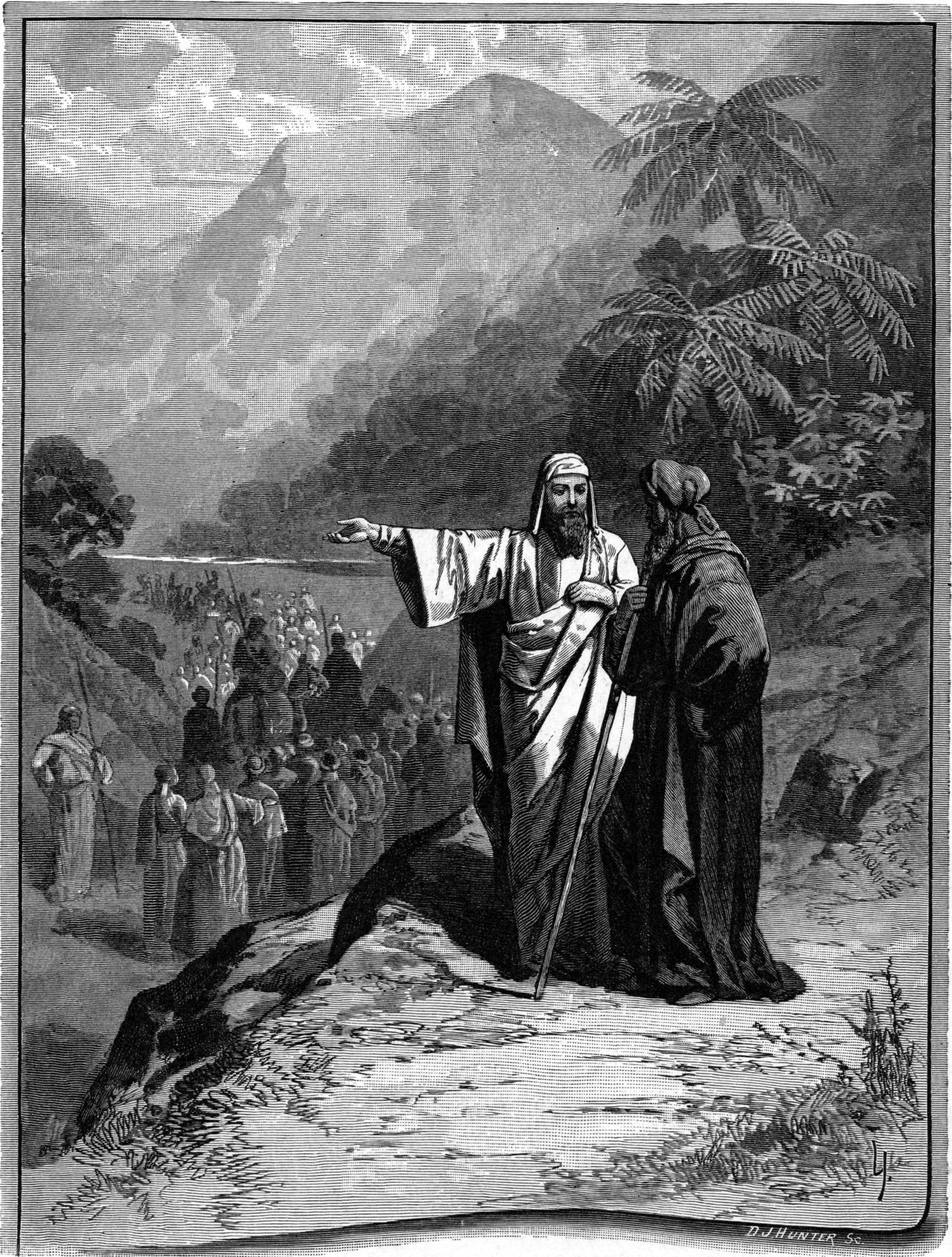
Abraham and Lot Divided the Land (illustration from the 1897 Bible Pictures and What They Teach Us by Charles Foster)

Abraham and Lot's conflict (Hebrew: מריבת רועי אברהם ורועי לוט, Merivat Roey Avraham Ve'Roey Lot) is an incident recorded in the Book of Genesis, in the weekly Torah portion, Lech-Lecha, which recounts the separation of Abraham and Lot, as a result of a dispute among their shepherds. The dispute ends in a peaceful way, in which Abraham concedes a part of the Promised Land, which belongs to him, in order to resolve the conflict peacefully.

== Biblical narrative ==
Abraham, his wife Sarai, and his nephew Lot return to the Negev from Egypt, and then return to the land between Bethel and Ai in Canaan, where they had lived before the famine of Genesis 12.

In Genesis 13:5-13, Abram and Lot separate, as a result of the quarrel among the shepherds. Lot is described as a very wealthy man, like Abraham is after his return from Egypt, although Abram's wealth includes gold and silver as well as livestock and herdsmen.

The biblical text does not elaborate on the exact reason for the dispute, however, as a result of this, Abraham offers Lot to separate, in order to prevent the fight, and he grants Lot the right to be the first among the two to pick the territory he desires:

5 And Lot also, which went with Abram, had flocks, and herds, and tents. 6 And the land was not able to bear them, that they might dwell together, for their substance was great, so that they could not dwell together. 7 And there was a strife between the herdmen of Abram's cattle and between the herdmen of Lot's cattle, and the Canaanite and the Perizzite dwelled then in the land. 8 And Abram said unto Lot, "Let there be no strife, I pray thee, between me and between thee and between my herdmen and between thy herdmen, for we be brethren. 9 Is not the whole land before thee? Separate thyself, I pray thee; if thou wilt take the left hand, then I will go to the right; or if thou depart to the right hand, I will go to the left. "

— Genesis 13:5-9

Robert Alter suggests that Abraham's language is "clear, firm and polite". Lot accepts the peace deal, for the Partition of the Land, and chooses the area of the plain of the Jordan – in the area including Sodom, and the story ends with Abraham and Lot separately settling in different areas of the Land:

10 And Lot lifted up his eyes, and beheld all the plain of the Jordan, that it was well watered every where; before the Lord destroyed Sodom and Gomorrah, even as the garden of the Lord, like the land of Egypt, as thou comest unto Zoar. 11 Then Lot chose him all the plain of the Jordan; and Lot journeyed east: and they separated themselves the one from the other. 12 Abram dwelled in the land of Canaan, and Lot dwelled in the cities of the plain, and he pitched his tent toward Sodom.

— Genesis 13:10-12

Genesis 13:18 sees Abram settling "by the oaks of Mamre, which are at Hebron". He is "living by the oaks of Mamre the Amorite, brother of Eshcol and of Aner, ... allies of Abram" in Genesis 14:13 at the time of the Battle of Siddim.

== Interpretation ==
This incident provides an early example of the divide and choose procedure for fair division of a continuous resource between two parties.

=== Jewish exegesis ===
Abraham finds the flows of water but, after this, these were closes. Isaac and Jacob "renew these treasures":

I shall tell you a principle that you will discern in all of the coming Torah portions regarding Abraham, Isaac, and Jacob. It is something of great significance that our Rabbis mentioned in brief, saying, "everything that happened to the Forefathers is a sign for the progeny". Therefore, the verses dilate upon the travels, well-digging, and other occurrences (mikrim). One might think them superfluous matters of no value, but they all come "to teach about the future".

— Nachmanides

So this water became "bitumen", i.e. "oil". Eretz Israel was also historically full of this "element".

== Outcome ==
The reference to Sodom in verse 13 suggests that Lot made a bad choice. The narrator uses Lot's choice of land near Sodom as a way of foreshadowing Lot's role in the Battle of Siddim, in which Lot is taken captive in battle, and the role of Lot in the destruction of Sodom and Gomorrah. According to Genesis 13:12, Lot pitches his tents near Sodom. By 14:12, Lot is living in the city itself. The destruction of Sodom is related in chapter 19.
