= Perizzites =

Group of people mentioned in the Bible

The Perizzites (Hebrew: פְּרִזִּי, romanized: Pərizzi) are a group of people mentioned many times in the Hebrew Bible as having lived in the land of Canaan before the arrival of the Israelites. The name may be related to a Hebrew term meaning "rural person" or people who lived in unwalled towns.

== Biblical account ==
Biblical references to the Perizzites extend from the time of Abraham (Genesis 13:7) to the time of Ezra and Nehemiah (Ezra 9:1–2). Following the rape of Dinah and the response of two of her brothers, Simeon and Levi, reported in Genesis 34, Jacob reports his concern that their actions have threatened his relationship with the inhabitants of the land where he has settled, "the Canaanites and the Perizzites".

The time during which Perizzites were most in conflict with the Israelites seems to have been during the time of Joshua and the early period of the Judges. According to the Book of Joshua, the Perizzites were in the hill country of Judah and Ephraim. According to 1 Kings 9:20–21, they were servants of Solomon.

== Interpretation ==
According to Michael LeFebvre, Ezra's reference to the Perizzites does not imply that a group still known as Perizzites existed in the land in Ezra's time. It is instead to be understood as a literary reference by Ezra to passages such as Exodus 33:2, Exodus 34:11–16, and Deuteronomy 7:1–5, which prohibited intermarriage with a variety of non-Israelite peoples, including Perizzites.

According to Hittitologist Trevor R. Bryce, "The Perizzites cannot be linked to any peoples or lands known from extra-biblical sources", but there are speculative links to the Hivites and the Jebusites, who may have originated from a region called Que in Assyrian sources or Kue/Quoah in biblical sources. H. E. Ryle and others have noted that the distinction between the Canaanites and the Perizzites may amount to a distinction between walled city and unwalled city residents.

== Jewish Encyclopedia entry ==
The Jewish Encyclopedia's entry on the Perizzites reads

[A] Canaanitish tribe settled in the south of Palestine between Hor and Negeb, although it is not mentioned in the genealogy in Gen. x. According to the Biblical references, Abraham, when he entered Palestine, found the Perizzites dwelling near the Canaanites (ib. xiii. 7), and God promised to destroy both these peoples (ib. xv. 20). Jacob reproved his sons because of the crime of Shechem, inasmuch as he feared the Perizzites and the Canaanites (ib. xxxiv. 30). Moses promised the Israelites to bring them unto the place of the Perizzites and the Amorites (Ex. xxx. 8); and at a later time the tribes of Simeon and Judah conquered the Canaanites and the Perizzites (Judges i. 4). The Perizzites were among the tribes that were not subjected to tribute by Solomon (I Kings ix. 20-22), while the complaint was brought to Ezra that the priests and the Levites would not separate themselves from the Perizzites and the other peoples of the land (Ezra ix. 1).
The view was formerly held that the Perizzites were a prehistoric tribe which became assimilated to the Canaanites when the latter invaded Palestine; but this is in contradiction to the fact that the Perizzites are not mentioned in the genealogy. More recent commentators are of the opinion that the names "Perizi" and "Perazi" are identical, and that the Bible has included under the name "Perizzites" all stocks dwelling in unwalled towns. (Note: The Israelites' conquest of peoples who lived in "very many unwalled cities" is celebrated in Deuteronomy 3:5-6.)

== Bibliography ==
- Riehm, E., Handwörterbuchs des biblischen Altertums für gebildete Bibelleser, 2nd ed., p. 1211.
- Cheyne and Black, Encyclopedia Biblica, s.v.
- Hastings' Dictionary of the Bible, s.v.
- The Zondervan Pictorial Encyclopedia of the Bible; Merrill Tenney, ed., Zondervan Publishing House, 1976; Vol. 4, p. 704
