= Ezra–Nehemiah =

Book in the Hebrew Bible

Ezra–Nehemiah (Hebrew: עזרא נחמיה, 'Ezrā-Nəḥemyā) is a book in the Hebrew Bible found in the Ketuvim section, originally with the Hebrew title of Ezra (Hebrew: עזרא, 'Ezrā), called Esdras B (Ἔσδρας Βʹ) in the Septuagint. The book covers the period from the fall of Babylon in 539 BCE to the second half of the 5th century BCE, and tells of the successive missions to Jerusalem of Zerubbabel, Ezra, and Nehemiah, and their efforts to restore the worship of the God of Israel and to create a purified Jewish community. In this vein, Ezra-Nehemiah contains an anti-alien polemic, forbidding intermarriage between the Israelites and gentiles. It is the only part of the Bible that narrates the Persian period of biblical history.

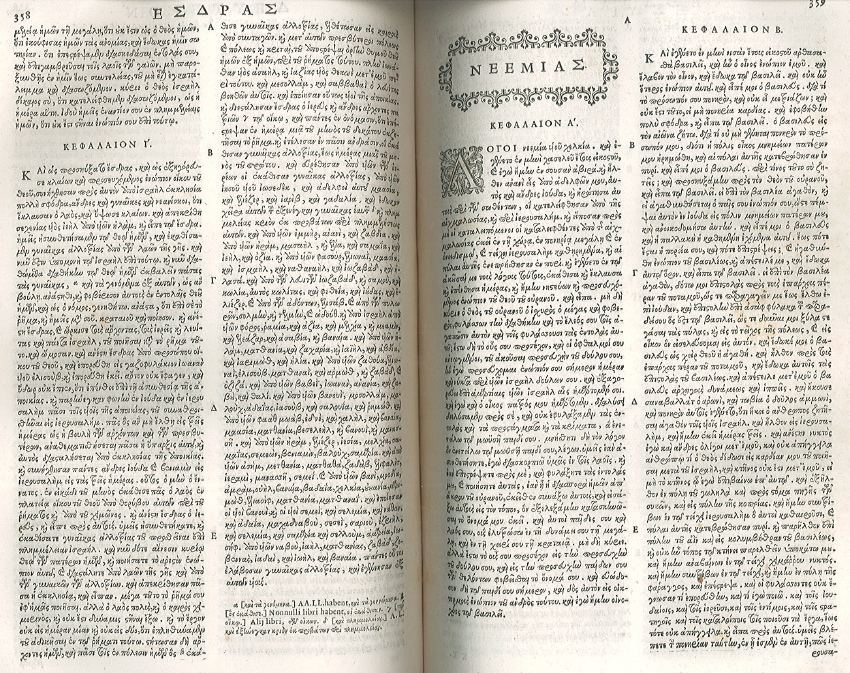
Septuagint version of the end of Ezra and beginning of Nehemiah

There is no historical consensus on Ezra's existence or mission due to a lack of extrabiblical evidence and conflicting scholarly interpretations, ranging from viewing him as a historical Aramean official to a literary figure, with debates hinging on the authenticity of the Artaxerxes rescript and its dating.

The historicity of Nehemiah, his mission, and the Nehemiah Memoir have recently become very controversial in academic scholarship, with maximalists viewing it as a historical account and minimalists doubting whether Nehemiah existed.

== Historical background ==
In the early 6th century Judah rebelled against Babylon and was destroyed (586 BCE). The royal court and the priests, prophets and scribes were taken into captivity in Babylon. There the exiles blamed their fate on disobedience to God and looked forward to a future when a penitent and purified people would be allowed to return to Jerusalem and rebuild the Temple. (These ideas are expressed in the prophets Jeremiah (although he was not exiled to Babylon), Isaiah, and, especially, Ezekiel). The same period saw the rapid rise of Persia, previously an unimportant kingdom in present-day southern Iran, and in 539 BCE Cyrus the Great, the Persian ruler, conquered Babylon.

King of Persia	Events in the wider region	Correlation with Ezra–Nehemiah
Cyrus (550–530)	Fall of Babylon, 539	Edict of Cyrus: directive to the Jews to rebuild the Temple; first return of exiles to Jerusalem, 538; altar restored and foundations of Temple laid.
Cambyses (530–522)	Conquest of Egypt, 525	Work on the Temple halted due to the plots of the Samaritans.
Darius I (522–486)	Secures the throne in 520/519 after fighting off various rivals	Edict of Cyrus rediscovered: Temple rebuilt, sixth year of Darius (515). In the book of Daniel, Darius has the old title of Darius I (king of the Chaldeans = Babylonians), while Koresh has the new one of Xerxes (king of the Persians).
Xerxes (486–465)	Failed attempt to conquer Greece, beginning of struggle with Greeks for control of the eastern Mediterranean	(Alternative) directive by Koresh to the Jews to rebuild the Temple; first return of exiles to Jerusalem, altar restored and foundations of Temple laid.
Artaxerxes I (465–424)	Successful suppression of Greek-supported revolt in Egypt, 460–456; revolt of Megabyzus, governor of the territory which included Judah, 449	Most widely accepted period for arrival of Ezra in the "seventh year of Artaxerxes"; second return of the exiles to Jerusalem (458 if the king is Artaxerxes I, or 428 if the year is read as his thirty-seventh instead of his seventh). (Alternative) work on the Temple halted due to the plots of the Samaritans; mission of Nehemiah, 445–433.
Darius II (423–404)	Peloponnesian War; Persia supports the Spartan side	(Alternative) edict to rebuild the Temple rediscovered: Temple rebuilt, sixth year of Darius.
Artaxerxes II (404–358)	Egypt regains independence, 401	(Alternative) period for arrival of Ezra and second return of exiles to Jerusalem (398 if the king is Artaxerxes II)
Artaxerxes III (358–338)	Egypt reconquered	In his Historia Scholastica Petrus Comestor identified Artaxerxes III as king Ahasuerus in the book of Esther (Esther 1:1/10:1–2).
Darius III (336–330)	Persia conquered by Alexander the Great	

== Composition ==
In the 19th century and for much of the 20th, it was believed that Chronicles and Ezra–Nehemiah came from the same author or circle of authors (similar to the traditional view which held Ezra to be the author of all three), but the usual view among modern scholars is that the differences between Chronicles and Ezra–Nehemiah are greater than the similarities, and that Ezra–Nehemiah itself had a long history of composition from many sources, stretching from the early 4th century down to the Hellenistic period.

The accepted view throughout the 19th century and for much of the 20th was that Chronicles and Ezra–Nehemiah made up a single "Chronicler's History" by an anonymous "Chronicler". This consensus was challenged in the late 1960s in an important article by Sara Japhet, and today three positions dominate discussion: first, an affirmation that a Chronicler's History existed and included all or part of Ezra–Nehemiah; second, a denial that Chronicles and Ezra–Nehemiah were ever combined; and third, the suggestion that the two were by the same author but written at different times and issued as separate works. Of the three, it is generally accepted that Ezra–Nehemiah forms a unified work separate from Chronicles: the many scholars who agree on this include H. G. M. Williamson, Sara Japhet, and Gary Knoppers. H. G. M. Williamson (1987) sees three basic stages to the composition of Ezra–Nehemiah: (1) composition of the various lists and Persian documents, which he accepts as authentic and therefore the earliest parts of the book; (2) composition of the "Ezra memoir" and "Nehemiah memoir", about 400 BCE; and (3), composition of Ezra 1–6 (the story of Zerubabbel) as the final editor's introduction to the combined earlier texts, about 300 BCE.

More recently Juha Pakkala (2004) has carried out an extensive analysis of the layers in Ezra. He sees the account of the rebuilding of the Temple (Ezra 5:1–6:15) and the core of the "Ezra memoir" (Ezra 7–10/Nehemiah 8) developing separately until they were combined by an editor who wished to show how the Temple and the Torah were reintroduced into Judah (known to Persian rulers as Yehud Medinata) after the exile. This editor also added Ezra 1–5. The combined text was then further developed by priestly circles who stressed Temple over Torah, transformed Ezra from scribe to priest, and stressed the primacy of the Babylonian returnees over those who had remained in the land, a distinction that had not appeared in the original Ezra material. Still later, Levitical editors combined Ezra and Nehemiah to produce the final form of the book, reintroducing interest in Torah and stressing the primacy of the Levites.

Jacob Wright (2004) has carried out similar work on Nehemiah. According to his study the original "Nehemiah memoir" was an account of the rebuilding of the city walls. Successive layers were then added to this, turning the building report into an account of Judah's restoration and depicting Nehemiah as a Persian governor who reforms the community of Israel. Finally, after Ezra had come into existence through the combination of Ezra 1–6 with Ezra 7–10, the accounts of the repopulation and dedication of the city and the friction between the Temple and the Torah were added to produce the final book of Nehemiah.

Lester Grabbe (2003), based on various factors including the type of Aramaic used in the youngest sections and the ignorance of Ezra–Nehemiah as a single book displayed by other Hellenistic Jewish writers, suggests that the two texts were combined, with some final editing, in the Ptolemaic period, c. 300 – c. 200 BCE.

Israeli archaeologist Israel Finkelstein has argued extensively that large portions of Ezra–Nehemiah (as well as Chronicles) include content not supported by the archaeology of Jerusalem and Yehud during the Persian period. Finkelstein found that these passages better reflect the Hasmonean period—a time when Jerusalem and its surround region were much more populated and prosperous—suggesting that Hasmonean authors added them to earlier Persian-era texts. In 2026, Finkelstein summarized this argument and extended it to the Priestly writings, proposing that parts of Ezra–Nehemiah and Chronicles, together with the Priestly writings, were composed or redacted in the second half of the second century BCE to support Hasmonean claims to legitimacy.

== Textual history ==
The Hebrew Ezra–Nehemiah was translated into Greek by the mid-2nd century BCE. The Greek and Roman rendering of Ezra's name is Esdras, and there are two versions of the Greek Ezra–Nehemiah, Esdras alpha (Ἔσδρας Αʹ) and Esdras beta (Ἔσδρας Βʹ). Esdras beta, which is still used in churches of the Greek-speaking and other Orthodox Christian traditions, is close to the standard Hebrew version, but Esdras alpha (or 1 Esdras) is very different: it reproduces only the material that pertains to Ezra, and ignores Nehemiah; while including additional material in the form of the "Tale of the Three Guardsmen" (1 Esdras 3:4 to 4:4). When early Christian authors cite the "Book of Ezra" it is always Esdras alpha to which they refer. Esdras beta (Ezra–Nehemiah) supplemented Esdras alpha in Christian bibles from the 4th century onwards but appears rarely to have been read as scripture; only the "Nehemiah" sections are ever cited in patristic texts. The earliest Christian commentary on Ezra–Nehemiah is that of Bede in the early 8th century.

The fact that Ezra–Nehemiah was translated into Greek by the mid-2nd century BCE suggests that this was the time by which it had come to be regarded as scripture. It was treated as a single book in the Hebrew, Greek and Old Latin manuscripts. The duplication of translations of Ezra was rejected by Jerome in his Latin Vulgate translation, who did not translate 'Esdras alpha'. In later medieval manuscripts of the Vulgate, especially the Paris Bibles of the 13th century onwards, the single book of Ezra (corresponding to Ezra–Nehemiah) is increasingly split in two so that the two-book tradition became fixed in the Western church. Jewish bibles continued to treat it as a unified work, with the title "Ezra," until the 15th century, but modern Hebrew bibles still print the Masoretic notes at the end of Nehemiah listing the middle verse as Nehemiah 3:32, indicating that a complete work of Ezra–Nehemiah is in view. (To confuse the matter further, there are other quite distinct works in the name of Esdras, largely dealing with visions and prophecies.)

The Masoretic Text of Ezra–Nehemiah is largely in Late Biblical Hebrew, with significant sections in Biblical Aramaic there are occasional reflections of Old Persian vocabulary, but little significant influence from Greek.

== Summary and structure ==
A page from the Leningrad Codex with the text of Ezra 10:24–Nehemiah 1:9a. The break between the books is designated by a single blank line.

Ezra 1 (the Edict of Cyrus) and Ezra 2 (the list of returnees) are presented as Persian documents; Ezra 3–6, which contains further supposed Persian documents mixed with third-person narrative, may be based on the prophetic works of Haggai and Zechariah, who were active at the time; Ezra 7–10, partly in the first-person, is sometimes called the "Ezra Memoir", but has been so heavily edited that the source, if it exists, is very difficult to recover. There is widespread agreement that a genuine memoir underlies Nehemiah, although it has clearly been edited. It can be no earlier than about 400 BCE, but is probably later, possibly even as late as 336–331 BCE (the reign of Darius III, the last Persian king); it probably circulated as an independent document before being combined with Ezra.

There are seven Persian documents embedded in Ezra–Nehemiah, six in Ezra and one in Nehemiah. All but one are in Aramaic language, the administrative language of the Persian empire. A study by Lester Grabbe argues that while genuine Persian documents may underlie a number of them, they have been reworked to fit the purposes of later writers from the Hellenistic era. Some other scholars accept them as genuine, Persian-period compositions.

The narrative is highly schematic, each stage of the restoration following the same pattern: God "stirs up" the Persian king, the king commissions a Jewish leader to undertake a task, the leader overcomes opposition and succeeds, and success is marked by a great assembly.

Ezra–Nehemiah is made up of three stories: (1) the account of the initial return and rebuilding of the Temple (Ezra 1–6); (2) the story of Ezra's mission (Ezra 7–10 and Nehemiah 8); (3) and the story of Nehemiah, interrupted by a collection of miscellaneous lists and part of the story of Ezra.

Ezra 1–6

God moves the heart of Cyrus to commission Sheshbazzar "the prince of Judah", to rebuild the Temple; 40,000 exiles return to Jerusalem led by Zerubbabel and Joshua the high priest. There they overcome the opposition of their enemies to rebuild the altar and lay the foundations of the Temple. The Samaritans, who are their enemies, force work to be suspended, but in the reign of Darius the decree of Cyrus is rediscovered, the Temple is completed, and the people celebrate the feast of Passover.

Ezra 7–10

God moves king Artaxerxes to commission Ezra the priest and scribe to return to Jerusalem and teach the laws of God to any who do not know them. Ezra leads a large body of exiles back to the holy city, where he discovers that Jewish men have been marrying non-Jewish women. He tears his garments in despair and confesses the sins of Israel before God, then calls all the community's men to Jerusalem, where he commands them to send their foreign wives away. An investigation is then conducted, and Ezra 10 ends with a list of offending marriages and a statement that the foreign wives and their children were exiled.

Nehemiah 1–6

Nehemiah, cup-bearer to king Artaxerxes, is informed that Jerusalem remains without walls. He prays to God, recalling the sins of Israel and God's promise of restoration in the land. Artaxerxes commissions him to return to Jerusalem as governor, where he enforces the cancellation of debts among the Jews and rebuilds the walls while facing opposition from the governors of neighboring peoples.

Nehemiah 7–10

The list of those who returned with Zerubbabel is discovered. Ezra reads the law of Moses to the people and the people celebrate the Feast of Tabernacles for seven days; on the eighth they assemble in sackcloth and penitence to recall the past sins which led to the destruction of Jerusalem and the enslavement of the Jews, and enter into a covenant to keep the law and separate themselves from all other peoples.

Nehemiah 11–13

Nehemiah takes measures to repopulate the city and returns to Susa after 12 years in Jerusalem. After some time in Susa he returns, only to find that the people have broken the covenant. He enforces the covenant and prays to God for his favour.

== Themes ==
The Mercer Bible Dictionary notes three notable theological themes in Ezra and Nehemiah: God's use of foreign rulers for Israel's sake; opposition to Israel from foreign neighbours; and the need to separate Israel from foreign neighbours to preserve the purity of the people of God. In the last half of Nehemiah the emphasis shifts to the joint role of Ezra and Nehemiah in instructing the people in the Law and in the dedication of the wall, these two activities together forming the reconstitution of Jewish life in Jerusalem; Dillard and Longman describe this as the moment when "the whole city becomes holy ground."

== Division into Ezra and Nehemiah ==
The single Hebrew book "Ezra–Nehemiah", with the title "Ezra", was translated into Greek around the middle of the 2nd-century BCE. Slightly later a second, and very different, Greek translation was made, commonly referred to as 1 Esdras. The Septuagint includes both 1 Esdras and the older translation of Ezra–Nehemiah and names the two books as Esdras A and Esdras B, respectively. The early Christian scholar Origen remarked that the Hebrew 'book of Ezra' might then be considered a 'double' book. Jerome, writing in the early 5th century, noted that Greek and Latin Christians had since adopted this duplication. Jerome himself rejected the duplication in his Vulgate translation of the Bible into Latin from the Hebrew. Consequently, all early Vulgate manuscripts present Ezra–Nehemiah as a single book, as too does the 8th-century commentary of Bede, and in the 9th-century bibles of Alcuin and Theodulf of Orleans. However, from the 9th century onwards, Latin Bibles were found that, for the first time, separated the Ezra and Nehemiah sections of Ezra–Nehemiah as two distinct books, and this became standard in the Paris Bibles of the 13th century. It was not until 1516/17, in the first printed Rabbinic Bible of Daniel Bomberg, that the separation was introduced generally in Hebrew Bibles.

== Questions ==
=== Chronological order of Ezra and Nehemiah ===
The order of the two figures, Ezra and Nehemiah, is perhaps the most debated issue regarding the book. Ezra 7:8 records that Ezra arrived in Jerusalem in the seventh year of king Artaxerxes, while Nehemiah 2#Verses 1–8:1–9 has Nehemiah arriving in Artaxerxes' twentieth year. If this was Artaxerxes I (465–424 BCE), then Ezra arrived in 458 and Nehemiah in 445 BCE. Nehemiah 8–9, in which the two (possibly by editorial error) appear together, supports this scenario.

In 1890, however, it was proposed that Ezra's Artaxerxes was Artaxerxes II, and that the sequence should be reversed, with Nehemiah arriving in 445 and Ezra in 398 BCE. The argument has some persuasive evidence; for example: Nehemiah's mission is to rebuild the walls of Jerusalem, and Ezra 9:9 notes that Ezra found the walls in place when he arrived, and while Nehemiah lists the returnees who came back with Zerubbabel he seems to know nothing about the 5,000 or so who accompanied Ezra. Nevertheless, there are counter-arguments to each of these and other arguments, and the 398 date has not replaced the traditional one. A proposal that the reference to the "seventh year" of Artaxerxes (Ezra 7:7–8) should be read as "thirty-seventh year", putting Ezra's return in 428 BCE, has not won support.

=== Expulsion of gentiles in Ezra–Nehemiah ===
In Ezra 9 and 10, intermarriage between Israelite men and gentile women is forbidden, existing intermarriages are broken, and the gentile women and their children are expelled. This is a development in the prohibition of interfaith and inter-ethnic marriages in Judaism. Many authors have chimed in on the topic.

Hayes, in her article "Intermarriage and Impurity in Ancient Jewish Sources" states that earlier Deuteronomic laws only forbid intermarriage with Canaanite peoples, and that Ezra innovated by proposing that intermarriage is forbidden with all gentiles, which is based on the "religious notion of Israel as a holy seed". The rationale is that intermarriage with other peoples would profane the holy seed of Israel, rendering it non-holy, which Hayes argues is not exactly equivalent to more modern racial ideas of pure blood.

Olyan argues that Ezra-Nehemiah motivates the intermarriage ban by associating foreign peoples with impurity in a number of ways, and that this association is an innovation by the authors of Ezra-Nehemiah. The logic of the anti-alien rhetoric is not entirely consistent between sections of the text; Olyan writes that the "[p]ollution is associated with aliens and with intermarriage only in select texts, and the nature of the pollution in question varies with the texts." Due to the inconsistent rhetoric, Olyan sees that it may be possible to identify stages in the development of the anti-alien polemic. The earliest two ideas would be that priestly intermarriages defile the priestly lineage, and that the presence of foreigners in holy places makes the holy places "ritually" impure. The "moral" pollution associated with foreigners and intermarriage with them, and the idea that the Israelites should be separated from them would be a later development.

Paul Heger takes a different stance on the expulsion of the gentiles in Ezra–Nehemiah. According to Heger, Ezra's motive for expelling gentile women and their offspring was a belief that the identity of the Israelites did not depend of the ethnicity of their mothers, but on the seed of their fathers. The motive behind prohibiting intermarriage with all gentile women was due to the danger of assimilation resulting from the influence of social interaction with the surrounding nations. The expulsion of the foreign women and their offspring was directed in order to preserve the purity of the Israelite "holy seed". Thus, Ezra did not introduce the idea of matrilineal identity.

Katherine Southwood emphasizes that Ezra and Nehemiah are similar in their views of intermarriage in that both Ezra and Nehemiah allude to the Deuteronomic text in their narratives, and believe intermarriage to be a type of transgression. There are other similar nuances that lead some scholars to believe that they are from a similar source. However, there are also differences in the two sources that should not be forgotten. Firstly, the intermarriage debate is between different classes of people, each of which is trying to reserve their sense of ethnicity. Ezra argues that marriage with non-exilic Jews is a transgression, and Nehemiah emphasizes that marriage to non-Jews is a sin. Even though this book says specific groups, the book of Ezra prohibits all exogamy. According to Christine Hayes, Ezra is concerned about the holy seed being profaned since he believes God has chosen his people as being holy. Since anyone that is not inside of the chosen group is considered not holy, it would be sinful to marry and reproduce with them, according to Ezra. Scholars also believe that there were further political reasons behind Nehemiah's protest against intermarriage, and Ezra had a variety of different reasons. In either case, these two viewpoints on intermarriage with exogamous groups have differences, but ultimately, each is trying to promote and protect the ethnicity of their own group.

Southwood goes on to discuss that both Ezra and Nehemiah display a "consciousness of ethnicity', though Southwood focuses primarily on Nehemiah's case, and the importance of the relationship between ethnicity and language. In Nehemiah specifically, the women that the Jews have married are named specifically as from 'Ashdod, Ammon, and Moab' (Neh. 13:23). The concern is then expressed that the Ashdodites were connected to Nehemiah's statement of outrage when he says that 'half of their children spoke the language of Ashdod... and they were not able to speak the language of Judah' (Neh. 13:24). There is some debate as to how different the language of Ashdod was from the Hebrew. However, if the languages were similar, according to Southwood, the problem at stake would be the purity of the language. If this were an entirely different language altogether, the purity of the language would be concern, as well as the concern for the threat of the extinction of the Hebrew language. In either case, the religious and ethnic identity that is encapsuled with the Hebrew language was being put at stake. Southwood makes the point that Nehemiah's objection to intermarriage with foreign women, especially those aforementioned, relates to language being the symbol of ethnicity; therefore, it is not the language itself that is the problem, but rather the preservation of language is a "symptom of deeper concern about protecting ethnic identity." Thus, Southwood holds that both Ezra and Nehemiah are concerned about the legitimacy of their groups in relation to the experience of the exile, though Nehemiah's concern specifically emphasizes language as a potential means by which ethnicity seemed to be defined.

Southwood makes some points in her article in how the terms "race", "ethnicity", and "nationalism" can be used in translations of Ezra 9–10. She points out that there are multiple problems not only inside the text but in work of the scholars as well. Although it is evident that the terms "ethnicity" and "race" have similarities, one is just a secondary term of another. This however does not make the text easily translated and makes the expression of those terms as Southwood puts it not "appropriate" on any level. She argues that the text focuses on the distinction between the "people of the land" and the "Holy seed", rather than on physical difference such as skin and hair color, which in any case do not really differ between these two populations. Thus the term "ethnicity" may be best in relation to the people in general, but in relation to intermarriage Southwood feels that "nationalism" and "ethnicity" both do justice. She claims that the term "race" is not needed and is used in a negative manner.

Pieter M. Venter argues that most of the so-called "gentiles" in Ezra–Nehemiah were actually indigenous Judeans who emulated the Canaanites. The foreign women, in particular, symbolized the "foreignness" of female impurity, which was "powerful enough to impart ritual havoc". Venter cites verses such as Ezra 9:1 and notes that only the Ammonites, Moabites and Egyptians existed as separate ethnicities during the times of Ezra–Nehemiah. Nehemiah 13:23–27 adds the Philistines from Ashdod. This implied that the other ethnicites were "symbolic". Despite this, there are verses such as Ezra 6:21 which indicate that these "gentile Judeans" abandoned their pagan background to join Ezra–Nehemiah's exclusive community.

=== Sheshbazzar and Zerubbabel ===
Ezra begins with Cyrus entrusting the Temple vessels to Sheshbazzar, "prince of Judah"; this apparently important figure then disappears from the story almost entirely, and Zerubbabel is abruptly introduced as the main figure. Both are called governors of Judah and are both credited with laying the foundation of the Temple. A number of explanations have been proposed, including: (1) the two are the same person; (2) Sheshbazzar was in fact Shenazzar, Zerubabbel's uncle (mentioned in Chronicles); (3) Sheshbazzar began the work and Zerubbabel finished it.

=== The "law-book of Moses" read by Ezra ===
Ezra's mission according to Nehemiah 8 was to apply "the law of Moses" in Jerusalem, which he does by reading a "book of the law of Moses" (a "scroll" in Hebrew) in a marathon public session. Scholars disagree on what the law-book precisely was. Some have suggested it was some form of Deuteronomy, since Ezra's laws are heavily skewed towards that book; others have proposed that it was the "Priestly Writing", which probably dates from the Persian period; a third suggestion, and most popular, is that it was a form of the Torah, as it was clearly associated with Moses and contained both Deuteronomistic and Priestly elements; and the fourth view is that Ezra's law-book is lost to us and cannot be recovered.

== See also ==
- Esdras, for a description of conflicting numbering schemes of books of Esdras
- 1 Esdras – the variant text of Chronicles–Ezra–Nehemiah
- Yehud Medinata – the Persian province centered in Jerusalem that is the setting for Ezra–Nehemiah

Ezra–Nehemiah Major prophets
Preceded by Esther	Hebrew Bible	Succeeded by Chronicles
Preceded by 1 Esdras	Eastern Orthodox; Old Testament	Succeeded by Tobit
