= John W. Rogerson =

English biblical scholar and Anglican priest (1935–2018)

The Reverend John W. Rogerson
- Born: John William Rogerson; 1935; London, England
- Died: 4 September 2018 (aged 83); Sheffield, England
- Spouse: Rosalind

Ecclesiastical career
- Religion: Christianity (Anglican)
- Church: Church of England
- Ordained: 1964

Academic background
- Education: Ripon Hall; University of Manchester
- Influences: Theodor W. Adorno; John M. Allegro; Arnold Anderson; Jan Assmann; Walter Benjamin; Ernst Bloch; S. G. F. Brandon; F. F. Bruce; Jürgen Habermas; Maurice Halbwachs; Max Horkheimer; Claude Lévi-Strauss; H. H. Rowley

Academic work
- Discipline: Biblical studies; theology
- Sub-discipline: Old Testament studies
- School or tradition: Broad-church Anglicanism; Christian socialism
- Institutions: University College, Durham; University of Sheffield
- Doctoral students: Stanley E. Porter

John William Rogerson (1935–2018) was an English theologian, biblical scholar, and priest of the Church of England. He was professor of biblical studies at University of Sheffield.

== Early life ==
He was born in 1935 in London and after serving in the Royal Air Force, where he worked in intelligence, he took a degree in theology at the University of Manchester. Among his teachers were H. H. Rowley, John M. Allegro, F. F. Bruce, S. G. F. Brandon, and Arnold Anderson. His ministerial training was at Ripon Hall, Oxford, followed by an honours degree in Oriental studies at Oxford, where he was taught by, among others, G. R. Driver. He also spent a term at the newly founded St. George's College, Jerusalem. After graduating from Oxford in 1963 he won a scholarship to the Hebrew University, where he studied under Chaim Rabin. In 1964 he moved to Durham as a lecturer and tutor at University College, where he was ordained. In 1971, researching in social anthropology, he made the first of many visits to Germany, which initiated his interest in especially 18th- and 19th-century German philosophy and biblical scholarship.

== Academic career ==
In 1975 he was awarded a DD from the University of Manchester and in 1979 was appointed professor and head of department at the University of Sheffield, where he led a renowned group of scholars. (Note: An account of the history of the Sheffield University Department of Biblical Studies, including the period of Rogerson's leadership, can be found in Clines 1998, especially pp. 36–39.) Among his many activities he began a series of annual, and extremely popular, student study visits to the Holy Land. He retired in 1996 and remained an active scholar. A Festschrift in his honour, The Bible in Human Society, was published in 1995, on his retirement from the Sheffield Chair. He has been awarded honorary degrees from Universities of Aberdeen (1998) Jena (2005) and Freiburg (2006).

John Rogerson's interests ranged widely from linguistics and philosophy to German biblical scholarship, Palestinian topography, and social anthropology. As David J. A. Clines remarked, "There proved to be almost no area to which Old Testament studies could be related in which John Rogerson did not make himself a master".

He was for many years the secretary of the British Society for Old Testament Study and was its president in 1989. He was a keen musician and played the cello, and continued an active ministry at Beauchief Abbey, Sheffield, as well as academic and pastoral writing.

Rogerson died on 4 September 2018 whilst in hospital in Sheffield.

== Selected writings ==
=== Books ===
- Rogerson, John W. (1974). Myth in Old Testament Interpretation. Beihefte zur Zeitschrift für die alttestamentliche Wissenschaft. Vol. 134. Berlin; New York: De Gruyter. ISBN 978-3-110-04220-7.
- ——— (1976). The Supernatural in the Old Testament. Interpreting the Bible. Lutterworth. ISBN 978-0-718-82233-0.
- ———; McKay, John W. (1977). Psalms. Cambridge Bible commentary. Cambridge; New York: Cambridge University Press. ISBN 978-0-521-21463-6.
- ——— (1979). Anthropology and the Old Testament. Growing Points in theology. Atlanta: John Knox Press; Blackwell. ISBN 978-0-804-20083-7.
- ——— (1984). Old Testament Criticism in the Nineteenth Century: England and Germany. Philadelphia: Fortress Press; SPCK. ISBN 978-0-800-60737-1.
- ——— (1982). Beginning Old Testament Study. Philadelphia, PA: Westminster Press; SPCK. ISBN 978-0-664-24451-4.
- ———; Davies, Philip R. (1989). The Old Testament World. Englewood Cliffs, NJ; Cambridge, England: Prentice-Hall; Cambridge University Press. ISBN 978-0-136-34049-2.
- ——— (1989). Atlas of the Bible. Phaidon Press. ISBN 978-0-714-82632-5.
- ——— (1995). The Bible and Criticism in Victorian Britain: Profiles of F.D. Maurice and William Robertson Smith.
- ———; Davies, Margaret; Carroll Rodas, Mark Daniel, eds. (1995). The Bible in Ethics: the Second Sheffield Colloquium. Journal for the Study of the Old Testament, Supplement Series. Vol. 207. Sheffield, England: Sheffield Academic Press. ISBN 978-1-850-75573-9.
- ——— (1999). Introduction to the Bible. London: Penguin Books. ISBN 978-0-140-25261-3.
- ——— (1999). Chronicle of the Old Testament Kings: the reign-by-reign record of the rulers of ancient Israel. New York: Thames and Hudson. ISBN 978-0-500-05095-8.
- ———; Carroll Rodas, Mark Daniel (2004). Theory and Practice in Old Testament Ethics. Journal for the Study of the Old Testament, Supplement series. Vol. 405. London; New York: T & T Clark. ISBN 978-0-826-47165-9.
- ——— (2009). A Theology of the Old Testament: Cultural Memory, Communication and Being Human. SPCK. ISBN 978-0281058754.

=== Articles ===
- ——— (1970). "The Hebrew Conception of Corporate Personality: A Re-Examination". Journal of Theological Studies. 21: 1–16.

== Notes ==
Academic offices
Preceded by Jaroslav Pelikan	Gifford Lecturer at the University of Aberdeen; 1994–1995	Succeeded by M. A. Stewart
