= Lester L. Grabbe =

American historian and professor (born 1945)

Lester Lee Grabbe
- Born: November 5, 1945 (age 80)
- Education: Ambassador College (MA); Claremont Graduate University (PhD); University of Hull (D.D.)

Lester L. Grabbe (born November 5, 1945) is an American-born scholar of Jewish history and the Hebrew Bible. His main areas of focus have been the history of ancient Israel and the Second Temple period. He serves as professor of religion at the University of Hull, England, teaching on the Hebrew Bible and Early Judaism, although he has since taken emeritus status. He is among the most distinguished and prolific historians of ancient Judaism, and is the author of several standard treatments for both students and scholars of the topic. He founded and convenes the European Seminar on Methodology in Israel's History, and published the proceedings in the sub-series "European Seminar in Historical Methodology" from 1997 to 2018.

== Life ==
Grabbe was born in Texas in 1945. He studied at Ambassador College in Pasadena, a Bible college where he earned his bachelor's and MA. He learned Greek, Hebrew, and Aramaic there. He then attended the School of Theology at Claremont Graduate University (CGU), where he earned his PhD, specializing in the Old Testament and expanding into other ancient languages including Ugaritic, Akkadian, and Coptic. At CGU, he was a student of William H. Brownlee. He earned a Doctor of Divinity (DD) at the University of Hull in Kingston upon Hull, UK, and became a professor of religion there where he spent the majority of his career. He took emeritus status at some point in the 2010s.

Grabbe delivered the 2008 Brownlee Memorial Lecture at CGU on the topic Exit David and Solomon? The Current Debate on the History of Ancient Israel. He is a frequent guest on both Viking Radio and BBC Radio Humberside.

A festschrift was published in Grabbe's honor in 2010 for his 65th birthday. Philip Davies and Diana Edelman edited the collection, offering "reflections on the practice and theory of history writing, on the current controversies and topics of major interest". The thirty included essays by his colleagues and friends also attest to Grabbe's influence on the field of biblical studies and history.

== Selected works ==
Grabbe has published a huge number of works, including books, journal articles, and chapters of larger commentaries. He has also served as editor on many scholarly article and essay collections.

Works as author

- Grabbe, Lester L. (1977). Comparative Philology and the Text of Job: A Study in Methodology. Scholars Press. ISBN 9780891301394. (an adaptation of Grabbe's thesis)
- Grabbe, Lester L. (1988). Etymology in Early Jewish Interpretation: The Hebrew Names in Philo. Brown Judaic Studies 115. Atlanta: Scholars Press. ISBN 9781555400804.
- Grabbe, Lester L. (1992). Judaism from Cyrus to Hadrian: Volume I: Persian and Greek Periods. Minneapolis: Fortress Press. ISBN 0-8006-2620-6.
- Grabbe, Lester L. (1992). Judaism from Cyrus to Hadrian: Volume 2: The Roman Period. Minneapolis: Fortress Press. ISBN 0-8006-2621-4. (An edition which combined both volumes was published in 1994.)
- Grabbe, Lester L. (1993). Leviticus. Old Testament Guides. Sheffield Academic Press. ISBN 1850757623.
- Grabbe, Lester L. (1995). Priests, Prophets, Diviners, Sages: A Socio-historical Study of Religious Specialists in Ancient Israel. Valley Forge: Trinity Press International. ISBN 9781563381324.
- Grabbe, Lester L. (1996). An Introduction to First Century Judaism: Jewish religion and history in the Second Temple period. T&T Clark. ISBN 9780567085061.
- Grabbe, Lester L. (1997). Wisdom of Solomon. Guide to the Apocrypha and Pseudepigrapha 3. Sheffield Academic Press. ISBN 1850757623.
  - Grabbe, Lester L. (2004). Wisdom of Solomon. T&T Clark Study Guides. T&T Clark. ISBN 978-0567084446.
- Grabbe, Lester L. (1998). Ezra and Nehemiah. Routledge. ISBN 0-415-14153-2.
- Grabbe, Lester L. (2000). Judaic Religion in the Second Temple Period: Belief and Practice from the Exile to Yavneh. Routledge. ISBN 978-0-415-21250-2.
- Grabbe, Lester L. (2004). A History of the Jews and Judaism in the Second Temple Period: Yehud: A History of the Persian Province of Judah. Library of Second Temple Studies 47. Vol. 1. T&T Clark. ISBN 0-5670-8998-3.
- Grabbe, Lester L. (2008). A History of the Jews and Judaism in the Second Temple Period: The Coming of the Greeks: The Early Hellenistic Period (335–175 BCE). Library of Second Temple Studies 68. Vol. 2. T&T Clark. ISBN 978-0-567-03396-3.
- Grabbe, Lester L. (2007). Ancient Israel: What Do We Know and How Do We Know It?. T&T Clark. ISBN 9780567032546.
  - Grabbe, Lester L. (2017). Ancient Israel: What Do We Know and How Do We Know It? (Revised ed.). T&T Clark. ISBN 978-0567670434.
- Grabbe, Lester L. (2010). An Introduction to Second Temple Judaism: History and Religion of the Jews in the Time of Nehemiah, the Maccabees, Hillel, and Jesus. T&T Clark. ISBN 978-0567552488.
- Grabbe, Lester L. (2016). 1 & 2 Kings: An Introduction and Study Guide: History and Story in Ancient Israel. T&T Clark Study Guides to the Old Testament. T&T Clark. ISBN 9780567670861.
- Grabbe, Lester L. (2018). Faith and Fossils: The Bible, Creation, and Evolution. Eerdmans. ISBN 9780802869104.
- Grabbe, Lester L. (2020). A History of the Jews and Judaism in the Second Temple Period: The Maccabean Revolt, Hasmonaean Rule, and Herod the Great (174–4 BCE). Library of Second Temple Studies 95. Vol. 3. T&T Clark. ISBN 978-0-5676-9294-8.
- Grabbe, Lester L. (2021). A History of the Jews and Judaism in the Second Temple Period: The Jews Under the Roman Shadow (4 BCE–150 CE). Library of Second Temple Studies 99. Vol. 4. T&T Clark. ISBN 978-0-5677-0070-4.
- Grabbe, Lester L. (2022). The Dawn of Israel: A History of Canaan in the Second Millennium BCE. T&T Clark. ISBN 9780567663214.
- Grabbe, Lester L. (2024). 'The Spirit of the Lord Came Upon Me': Prophets in Ancient Israel from a Cross-Cultural Perspective. T&T Clark. ISBN 9780567710703.

Works as an editor

- Grabbe, Lester L., ed. (1997). Can a 'History of Israel' Be Written?. The Library of Hebrew Bible/Old Testament Studies 245. Sheffield Academic Press. ISBN 978-0567043207.
- Grabbe, Lester L., ed. (1998). Leading Captivity Captive: 'The Exile' as History and Ideology. The Library of Hebrew Bible/Old Testament Studies 278. Sheffield Academic Press. ISBN 9781850759072.
- Grabbe, Lester L., ed. (2001). Did Moses Speak Attic?: Jewish Historiography and Scripture in the Hellenistic Period. The Library of Hebrew Bible/Old Testament Studies 317. Sheffield Academic Press. ISBN 9781841271552.
- Grabbe, Lester L.; Haak, Robert D., eds. (2001). 'Every City Shall Be Forsaken': Urbanism and Prophecy in Ancient Israel and the Near East. The Library of Hebrew Bible/Old Testament Studies 330. Sheffield Academic Press. ISBN 9781841272023.
- Grabbe, Lester L., ed. (2003). 'Like a Bird in a Cage': The Invasion of Sennacherib in 701 BCE. The Library of Hebrew Bible/Old Testament Studies 363. Sheffield Academic Press. ISBN 9780826462152.
- Grabbe, Lester L.; Haak, Robert D., eds. (2004). Knowing the End From the Beginning: The Prophetic, Apocalyptic, and their Relationship. Journal for the Study of the Pseudepigrapha 46. T&T Clark. ISBN 9780567084620.
- Grabbe, Lester L.; Bellis, Alice Ogden, eds. (2004). The Priests in the Prophets: The Portrayal of Priests, Prophets, and Other Religious Specialists in the Latter Prophets. The Library of Hebrew Bible/Old Testament Studies 408. T&T Clark. ISBN 978-0567081667.
- Grabbe, Lester L., ed. (2005). Good Kings and Bad Kings: The Kingdom of Judah in the Seventh Century BCE. The Library of Hebrew Bible/Old Testament Studies 393. T&T Clark. ISBN 9780567082725.
- Grabbe, Lester L., ed. (2007). Ahab Agonistes: The Rise and Fall of the Omri Dynasty. The Library of Hebrew Bible/Old Testament Studies 421. T&T Clark. ISBN 9780567045409.
- Grabbe, Lester L., ed. (2008). Israel in Transition: From Late Bronze II to Iron IIa (c. 1250-850 BCE): 1 The Archaeology. The Library of Hebrew Bible/Old Testament Studies 491. T&T Clark. ISBN 9780567599131. (Review)
- Grabbe, Lester L., ed. (2010). Israel in Transition: From Late Bronze II to Iron IIA (c. 1250-850 BCE): 2 The Texts. The Library of Hebrew Bible/Old Testament Studies 521. T&T Clark. ISBN 9780567638403.
- Becking, Bob; Grabbe, Lester L., eds. (2011). Between Evidence and Ideology: Essays on the history of ancient Israel read at the joint meeting of the Society for Old Testament Study and the Oud Testamentisch Werkgezelschap, Lincoln, July 2009. Oudtestamentische studiën 59. Brill. ISBN 978-9004187375.
- Knoppers, Gary N.; Grabbe, Lester L., eds. (2011). Exile and Restoration Revisited: Essays on the Babylonian and Persian Periods in Memory of Peter R. Ackroyd. Library of Second Temple Studies 73. With Deirdre Fulton. ISBN 978-0567280831. (a posthumous festschrift for Peter R. Ackroyd)
- Grabbe, Lester L.; Lipschits, Oded, eds. (2011). Judah Between East and West: The Transition from Persian to Greek Rule (ca. 400-200 BCE). Library of Second Temple Studies 75. T&T Clark. ISBN 9780567125613.
- Grabbe, Lester L., ed. (2011). Enquire of the Former Age: Ancient Historiography and Writing the History of Israel. The Library of Hebrew Bible/Old Testament Studies 554. T&T Clark. ISBN 9780567098238.
- Grabbe, Lester L.; Nissinen, Martti, eds. (2011). Constructs of Prophecy in the Former & Latter Prophets & Other Texts. Ancient Near East Monographs 4. Atlanta: Society of Biblical Literature. ISBN 978-1-58983-600-6.
- Korpel, Marjo A.; Grabbe, Lester L., eds. (2015). Open-Mindedness in the Bible and Beyond: A Volume of Studies in Honour of Bob Becking. The Library of Hebrew Bible/Old Testament Studies 616. T&T Clark. ISBN 9780567663801.
- Grabbe, Lester L., ed. (2016). The Land of Canaan in the Late Bronze Age. The Library of Hebrew Bible/Old Testament Studies 636. T&T Clark. ISBN 9780567683878.
- Grabbe, Lester L.; Boccaccini, Gabriele, eds. (2016). The Seleucid and Hasmonean Periods and the Apocalyptic Worldview. Library of Second Temple Studies 88. With Jason M. Zurawski. T&T Clark. ISBN 9780567666147.
- Grabbe, Lester L., ed. (2018). 'Even God Cannot Change the Past': Reflections on Seventeen Years of the European Seminar in Historical Methodology. The Library of Hebrew Bible/Old Testament Studies 663. T&T Clark. ISBN 9780567680563.

Festschrift

- Davies, Philip R.; Edelman, Diana Vikander, eds. (2010). The Historian and the Bible: Essays in Honour of Lester L. Grabbe. The Library of Hebrew Bible/Old Testament Studies 530. T&T Clark. ISBN 9780567202680.
