= The Chronicler =

Name designating author(s) of various Hebrew Bible books

The Chronicler is the author, or group of authors, to whom some biblical scholars have attributed the composition of: the Books of Chronicles, the Book of Ezra, and the Book of Nehemiah in the Hebrew Bible. Scholars believe that the Chronicler worked between 400 and 250 BC, with the period 350–300 BC the most likely.
