= Nehemiah 4 =

Chapter from Nehemiah in the Old Testament

- ← chapter 3 chapter 5 →
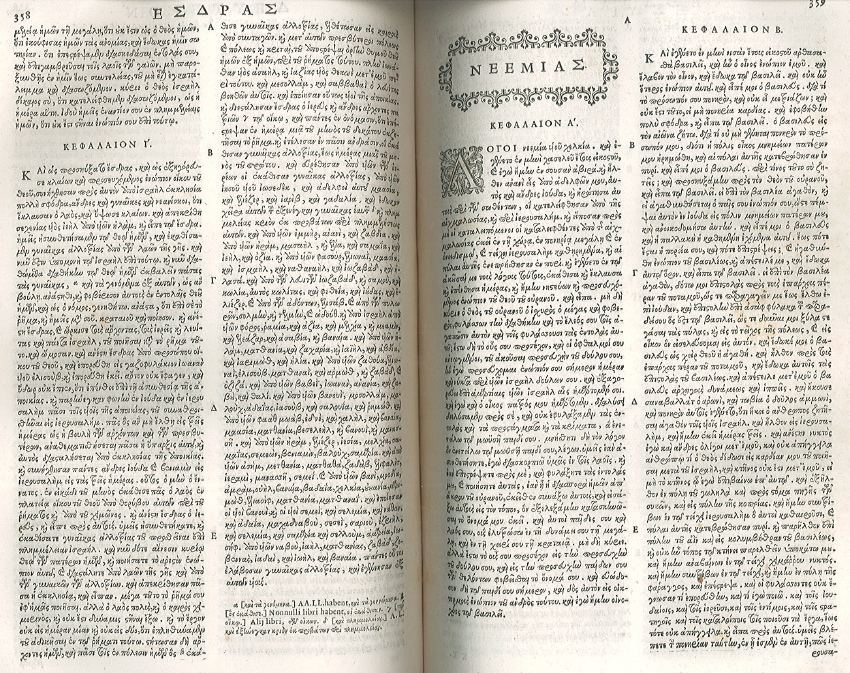
- Book of Nehemiah in the Roman (Sixtine) Septuagint (1587).
- Book: Book of Nehemiah
- Category: Ketuvim
- Christian Bible part: Old Testament
- Order in the Christian part: 16

Nehemiah 4 is the fourth chapter of the Book of Nehemiah in the Old Testament of the Christian Bible, or the 14th chapter of the book of Ezra-Nehemiah in the Hebrew Bible, which treats the book of Ezra and the book of Nehemiah as one book. Jewish tradition states that Ezra is the author of Ezra-Nehemiah as well as the Book of Chronicles, but modern scholars generally accept that a compiler from the 5th century BCE (the so-called "Chronicler") is the final author of these books. This chapter recounts how the Jews had to militarize the building of the wall due to the constant threat from their enemies.

== Text ==
The original text of this chapter is in Hebrew. In English bibles, this chapter is divided into 23 verses, but in Hebrew texts 4:1-6 is numbered 3:33-38, and 4:7-23 is numbered 4:1-17.

=== Textual witnesses ===
Some early manuscripts containing the text of this chapter in Hebrew are of the Masoretic Text, which includes Codex Leningradensis (1008). (Note: Since 1947 the whole book of Ezra-Nehemiah has been missing from the text of the Aleppo Codex.)

There is also a translation into Koine Greek known as the Septuagint, made in the last few centuries BCE. Extant ancient manuscripts of the Septuagint version include Codex Vaticanus (B; $\mathfrak{G}$^{B}; 4th century), Codex Sinaiticus (S; BHK: $\mathfrak{G}$^{S}; 4th century), and Codex Alexandrinus (A; $\mathfrak{G}$^{A}; 5th century).

== Derision (4:1–3) ==
When the restoration of the Jerusalem walls was advanced, Sanballat and his allies intensified the attacks beyond the scorn first mentioned in Nehemiah 2:19.

=== Verse 1 ===
But it came to pass, that when Sanballat heard that we builded the wall, he was wroth, and took great indignation, and mocked the Jews.

On discovering 'the systematic design of refortifying Jerusalem', the Samaritan faction represented by Sanballat showed their bitter animosity to the Jews and in heaping scoffs and insults, as well as all sorts of disparaging words, their feelings of hatred and contempt increased.

=== Verse 3 ===
Now Tobiah the Ammonite was beside him, and he said, "Whatever they build, if even a fox goes up on it, he will break down their stone wall.

The language about a fox on the wall is "troublesome". Some writers see the term as a reference to a siege weapon. H. G. M. Williamson sees it as a sarcastic reference to a small animal being able to break apart what the Jews are putting together.

== Nehemiah's response to the attack (4:4–6) ==
Refusing to engage in a war of words or retaliatory actions, Nehemiah prayed to God, then went to work.

=== Verse 6 ===
So built we the wall; and all the wall was joined together unto the half thereof: for the people had a mind to work.

- "All the wall was joined together unto the half thereof": that is, 'the whole continuous line of wall was completed to half the contemplated height'.

== Obstacles (4:7-23) ==
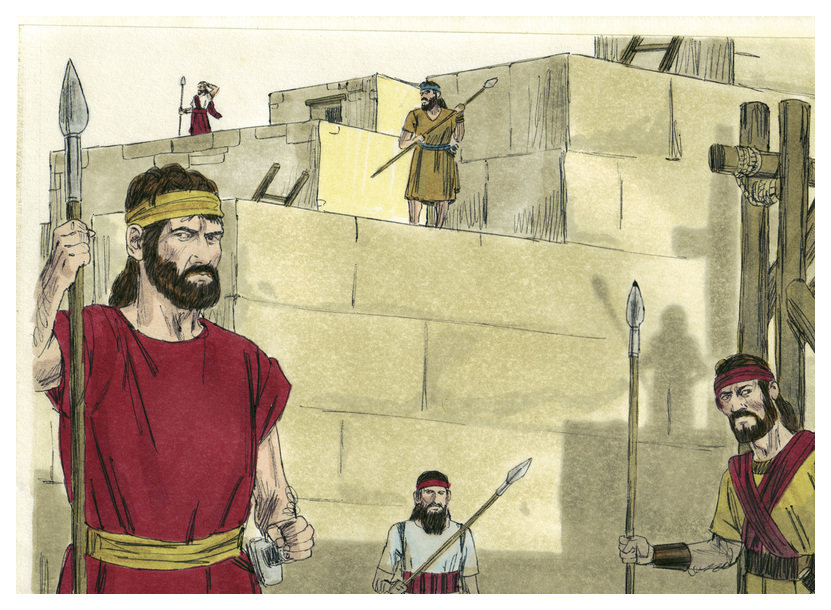
Militarizing the wall building. Illustration of Book of Nehemiah Chapter 4. Biblical illustrations by Jim Padgett

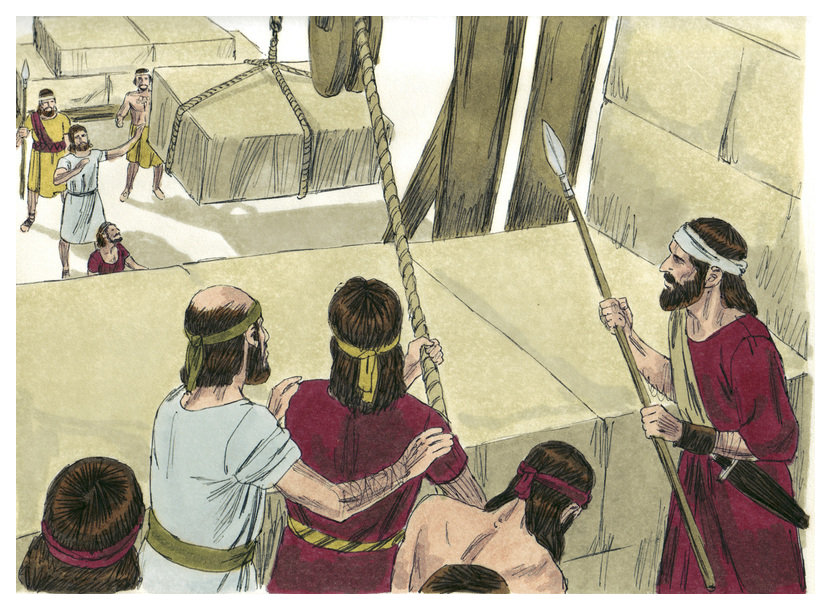
Ready to face the enemies. Illustration of Book of Nehemiah Chapter 4. Biblical illustrations by Jim Padgett

With each step forward, Nehemiah faced obstacles to complete the wall, but he persevered with prayer and hard work. In this section he described the plot (verses 7–9), discouragement (10), threats and rumors (11–12) against him, but then he found his resolve (13–15) and executed his contingency plans (16–23).

=== Verses 7–8 ===
^{7} But it came to pass, that when Sanballat, and Tobiah, and the Arabians, and the Ammonites, and the Ashdodites, heard that the walls of Jerusalem were made up, and that the breaches began to be stopped, then they were very wroth,
^{8} And conspired all of them together to come and to fight against Jerusalem, and to hinder it.

The Jews were completely encircled by the enemies: the Samaritans (Sanballat) in the north, the Ammonites (Tobiah) in the east, the Arabians (Geshem) in the south, and the Ashdodites in the east.

== See also ==
- Jerusalem
- Walls of Jerusalem
- Related Bible parts: Nehemiah 2

== Sources ==
- Fensham, F. Charles (1982). The Books of Ezra and Nehemiah. New international commentary on the Old Testament (illustrated ed.). Wm. B. Eerdmans Publishing. ISBN 978-0802825278.
- Grabbe, Lester L. (2003). "Nehemiah". In Dunn, James D. G.; Rogerson, John William (eds.). Eerdmans Commentary on the Bible (illustrated ed.). Wm. B. Eerdmans Publishing. pp. 320–328. ISBN 978-0802837110.
- Halley, Henry H. (1965). Halley's Bible Handbook: an abbreviated Bible commentary (24th (revised) ed.). Zondervan Publishing House. ISBN 0-310-25720-4.
- Larson, Knute; Dahlen, Kathy; Anders, Max E. (2005). Anders, Max E. (ed.). Holman Old Testament Commentary - Ezra, Nehemiah, Esther. Holman Old Testament commentary. Vol. 9 (illustrated ed.). B&H Publishing Group. ISBN 978-0805494693.
- Levering, Matthew (2007). Ezra & Nehemiah. Brazos Theological Commentary on the Bible. Brazos Press. ISBN 978-1587431616.
- McConville, J. G. (1985). Ezra, Nehemiah, and Esther. The daily study Bible : Old Testament. Westminster John Knox Press. ISBN 978-0664245832.
- Smith-Christopher, Daniel L. (2007). "15. Ezra-Nehemiah". In Barton, John; Muddiman, John (eds.). The Oxford Bible Commentary (first (paperback) ed.). Oxford University Press. pp. 308–324. ISBN 978-0199277186.
- Würthwein, Ernst (1995). The Text of the Old Testament. Translated by Rhodes, Erroll F. Grand Rapids, MI: Wm. B. Eerdmans. ISBN 0-8028-0788-7.
