= Ki Teitzei =

Part of Torah reading

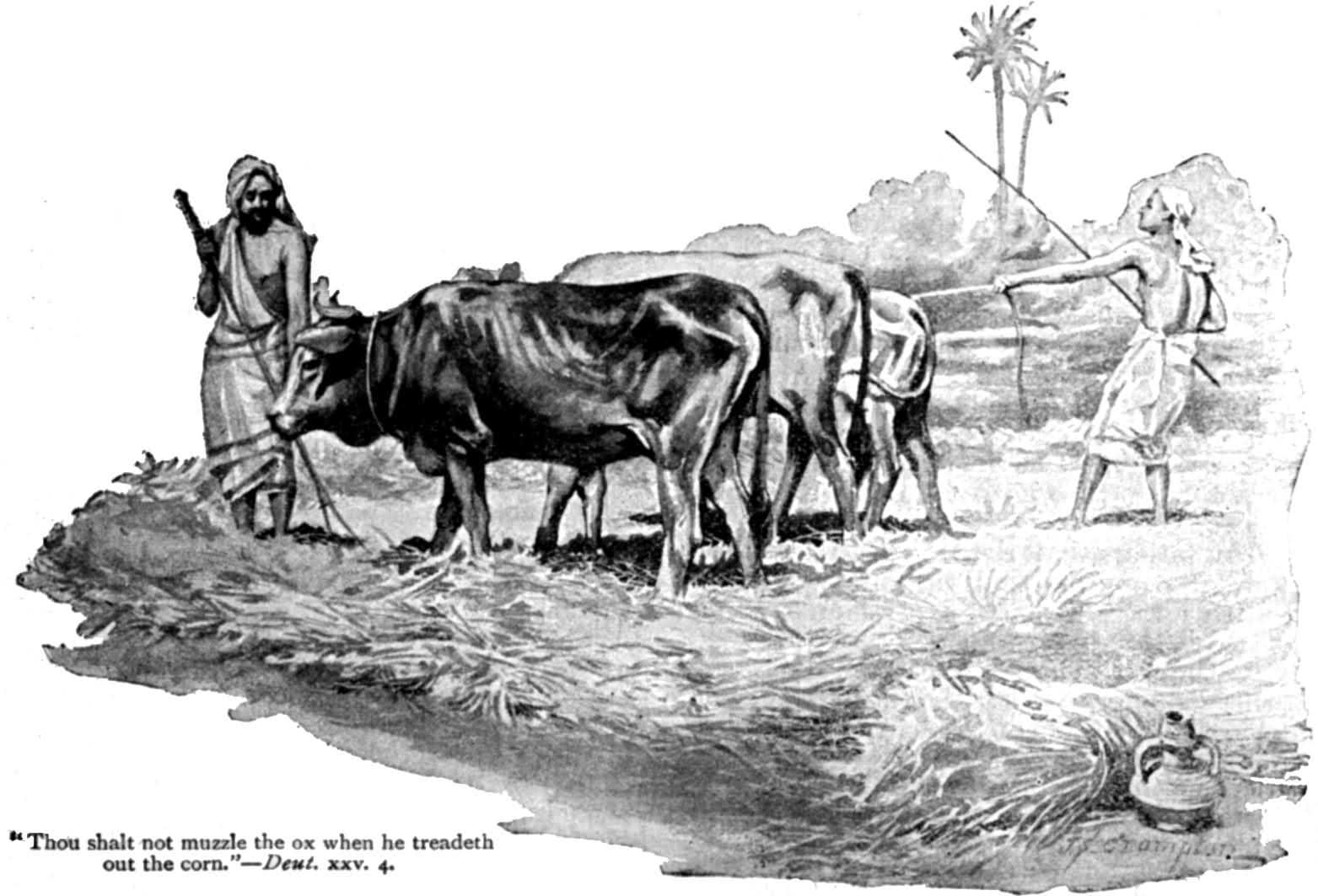
"Thou shalt not muzzle the ox when he treadeth out the corn." (Deuteronomy 25:4.) (illustration circa 1900 by James Shaw Crompton)

Ki Teitzei (Note: Also transcribed Ki Tetzei, Ki Tetse, Ki Thetze, Ki Tese, Ki Tetzey, or Ki Seitzei) (Biblical Hebrew: כִּי־תֵצֵא, romanized: kî-tēṣēʾ, lit. 'when [you] go out') is the incipit and title of the 49th weekly Torah portion, or parashah (Hebrew: פָּרָשָׁה, lit. 'portion'), in the annual cycle of Torah reading in Judaism. It is the sixth parashah in the book of Deuteronomy, comprising Deuteronomy 21:10–25:19. The parashah sets out a series of miscellaneous laws, mostly governing civil and domestic life, including the treatment of a beautiful captive woman; inheritance among the sons of two wives; the punishment of extremely wayward sons in the community; the treatment of the corpses of executed persons; the treatment of found property; actions undertaken when coming upon another in distress; rooftop safety; prohibited mixtures; sexual offenses, membership in the congregation; camp hygiene; runaway slaves; prostitution; yibbum (יִבּוּם, 'levirate marriage'); and destroying the memory of Amalek, among other topics.

The parashah is made up of 5,856 Hebrew letters, 1,582 Hebrew words, 110 verses, and 213 lines in a Torah Scroll (סֵפֶר תּוֹרָה, sefer Torah). Jews generally read the parashah in August or September. Jews also read the part of the parashah about Amalek (Deuteronomy 25:17–19) as the maftir (מַפְטִיר, maftîr, 'concluder') reading on Shabbat Zachor (שַׁבָּת זָכוֹר, Šabbāt Zākôr, 'Sabbath of Remembering'), the special Sabbath immediately before Purim, which commemorates the story of Esther and the Jewish people's squashing of Haman's plan to commit eliminationist genocide against Jews living in the Achaemenid Empire. Esther 3:1 identifies Haman as an Agagite, and thus a descendant of Amalek.

== Readings ==
In traditional Shabbat Torah reading, the parashah is divided into seven aliyot or "readings" (עֲלִיּוֹת, ʿăliyōt, 'ascents'). In the Masoretic Text of the Hebrew Bible, Ki Teitzei has two "open portions" (פְּתוּחָה, pᵊtūḥāh, 'open'), roughly equivalent to paragraphs, abbreviated with the Hebrew letter פ. Ki Teitzei has several further subdivisions, called "closed portions" (סְתוּמָה, sᵊtūmāh, 'closed'), abbreviated with the Hebrew letter ס within the first open portion. The long first open portion spans nearly the entire parashah, except for the concluding maftir reading. The short second open portion coincides with the maftir reading. Thus, the parashah is nearly one complete whole. Closed‑portion divisions divide all of the readings, often setting apart separate laws.

=== First reading—Deuteronomy 21:10–21 ===
In the first reading, Moses rules that if captives of war were taken and an Israelite soldier noticed a beautiful captive woman he wanted to take as a wife, the Israelite was to bring her into his household and home, have her hair cleaned and trimmed, her nails pared, and her dirty garbs discarded and replaced, and then allow her a month to lament the deaths of her loved ones, if applicable. Thereafter, the Israelite could take her as his wife. However, if the soldier found that he no longer wanted her as his wife, he was required to manumit her outright; he was not allowed to sell her into slavery. A closed portion ends here.

In the continuation of the reading, Moses instructed that if a man had two wives—one whom he loved deeply and another whom he did not love—and both wives bore him sons, but the unloved wife gave birth to his firstborn son, then when or if the man later decided to will his property to his sons, he was not allowed to treat the son of his beloved wife as the firstborn, ignoring the older son of his unloved wife. Instead, he was required to recognize the firstborn as the son of the unloved wife and to give him his birthright, which included a double portion of all that the man possessed, as mandated by biblical law. A closed portion ends here.

Moses then instructed that if a couple had an extremely wayward, defiant son who did not show obedience toward his parents even after they undergoing punishment, they were to bring him to the Israelite elders of their town and say, "This son of ours is disloyal and defiant; he does not heed us. He is a glutton and a drunkard." The Israelites of the town were then to stone him. The first reading and a closed portion end here.

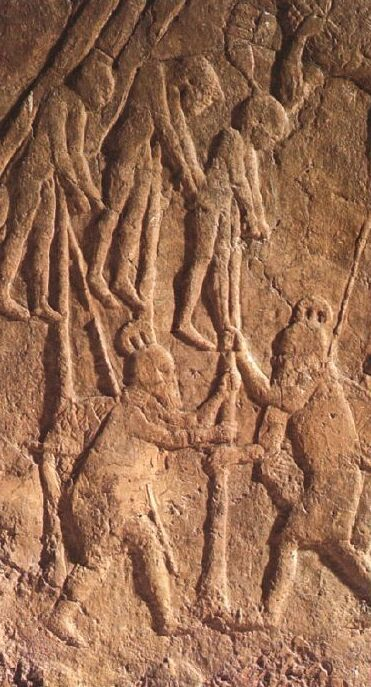
Impalement of Judeans in a neo-Assyrian relief

=== Second reading—Deuteronomy 21:22–22:7 ===
In the second reading, Moses instructed that if the community executed an individual for a capital offense by impaling them on a stake, they were not to let their corpse remain on the stake overnight. Instead, they were to bury them the same day, for an impaled body is an affront to God. A closed portion ends here with the end of the chapter.

In the continuation of the reading, Moses instructed that if one found another's lost ox, sheep, donkey, clothing, or any other lost thing, then one could not ignore it but was required to take it back to its owner. If the owner did not live near the finder or the finder did not know who the owner was, then the finder was to bring the thing home and keep it until the owner claimed it. A closed portion ends here.

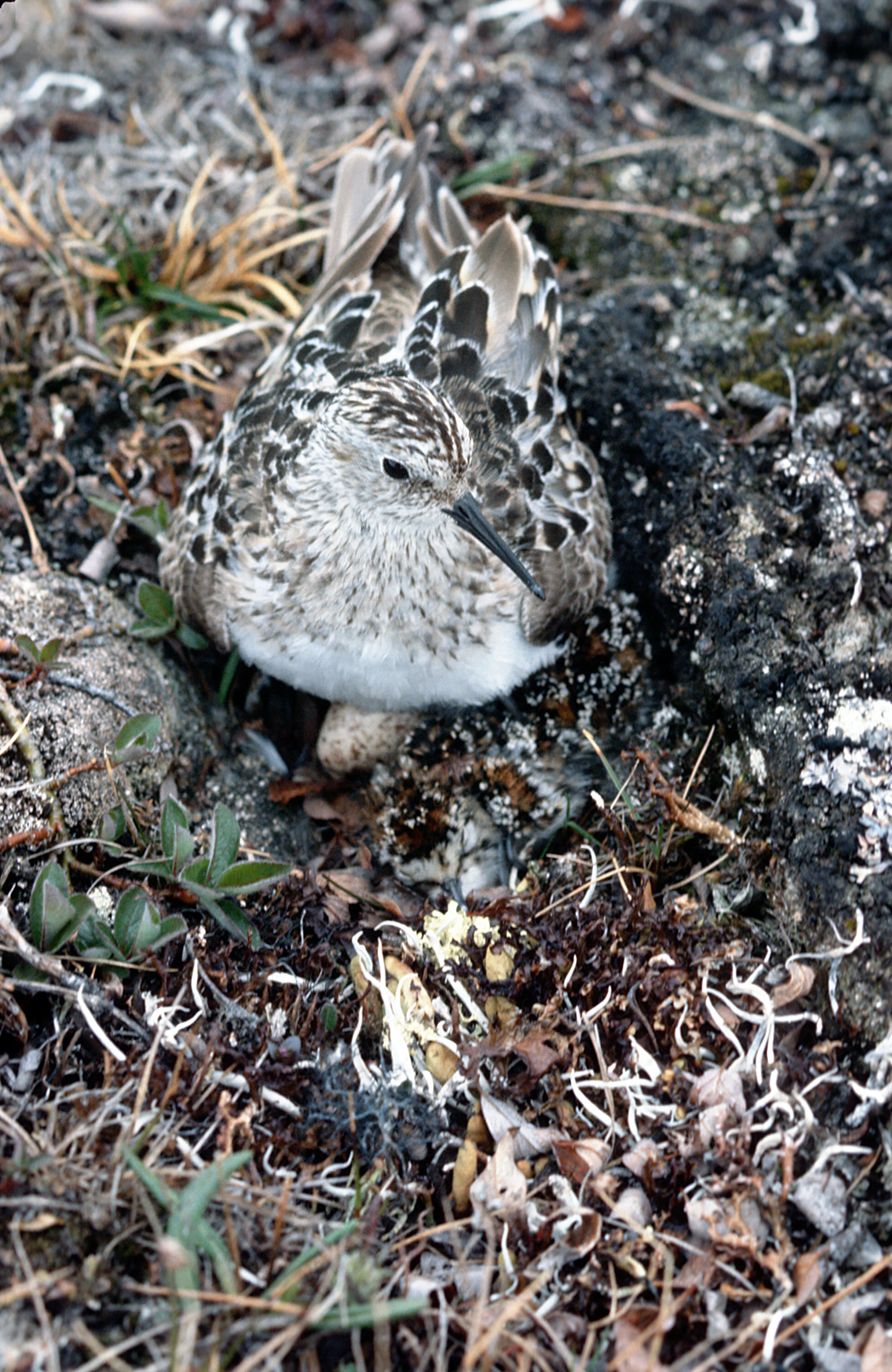
Mother sandpiper and egg in nest

Next, Moses instructed that if one came upon another's donkey or ox fallen on the road, one could not ignore it but was required to help the owner raise it. A closed portion ends here. Moses then instructed that a woman was not to put on a man's apparel, nor a man wear a woman's clothing, essentially prohibiting cross-dressing. Another closed portion ends here.

And as the reading continues, Moses instructed that if one came upon a bird's nest with the mother bird sitting over fledglings or eggs, one could not take the mother together with her young, but was required to let the mother go and take only the young. The act is referred to as shiluach haken ((שִׁלּוּחַ הַקֵּן, šilûaḥ haqqēn, 'sending away the nest'). The second reading and a closed portion end here.

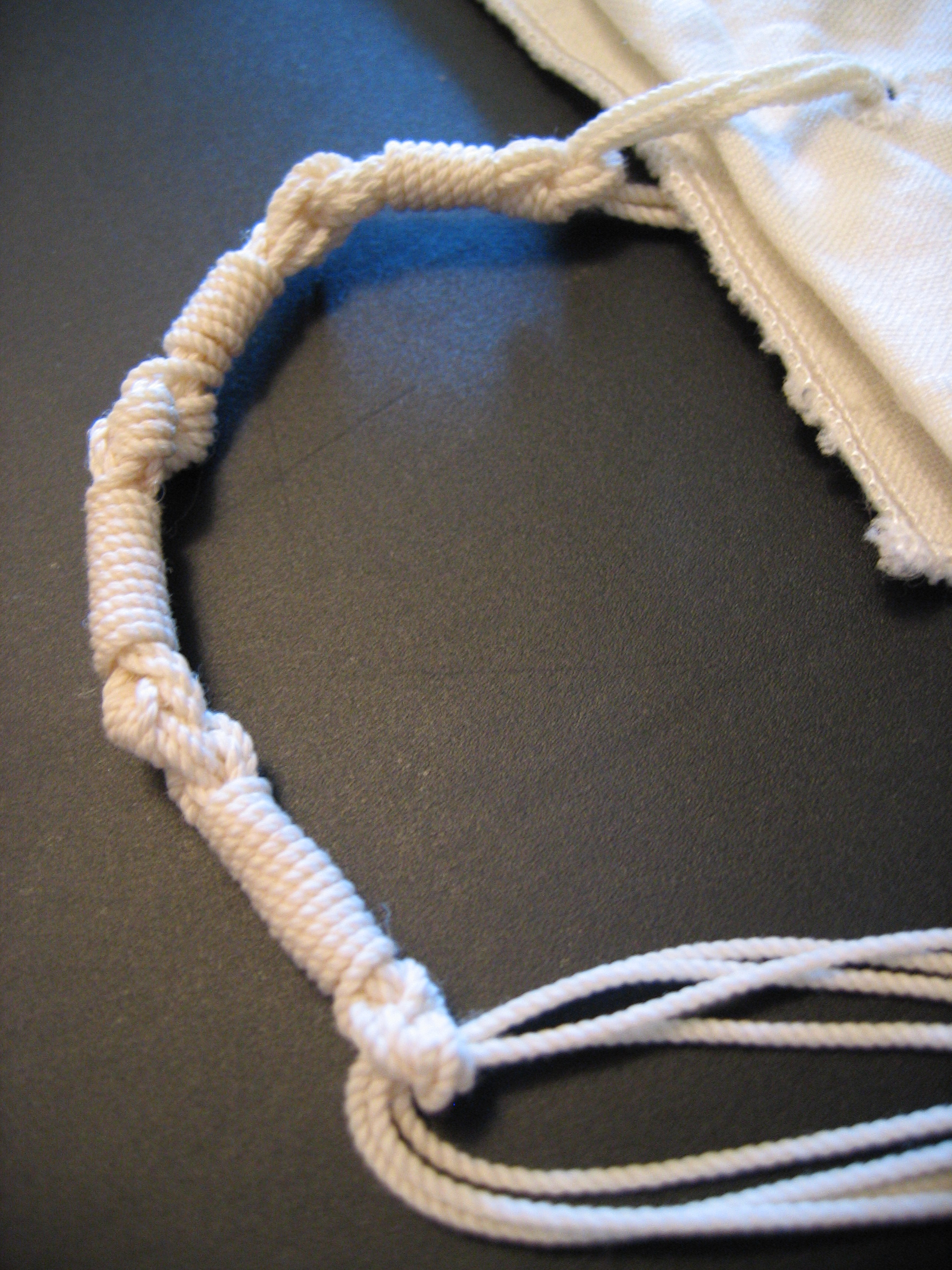
Tzitzit

=== Third reading—Deuteronomy 22:8–23:7 ===
In the third reading, Moses taught that when one built a new house, one had to make a parapet on the roof so that no one would fall from it. One was not to engage in sowing a vineyard with a second kind of seed, nor use the yield of such a vineyard. This is because the soil would not be enough for them, and the product of both would not be of good quality. A closed portion ends here.

In the continuation of the reading, Moses instructed that one was not to plough a field with an ox and a donkey together, as their force is uneven. One was not to wear cloth combining wool and linen together ((שַׁעַטְנֵז, šaʿaṭnēz, 'forbidden mixture'), as their integrity and quality would be lowered. A closed portion ends here.

Moses next instructed the Israelites to make tzitzit (צִיצִית, ṣîṣît, 'fringe') on the four corners of the garments with which they covered themselves. As garments like those worn by Israelites are no longer worn, religious Jews instead don a prayer shawl known as a tallit gadol (טַלִּית גָּדוֹל, ṭallît gādôl, 'great cloak') during the Shacharit (שַׁחֲרִית, šaḥarît, 'dawn') prayer service to fulfill the mitzvah (מִצְוָה, miṣwāh, 'commandment') described in Deuteronomy 22:12. Conservative and Orthodox Jewish men oftentimes wear a smaller garment, a tallit katan (טַלִּית קָטָן, ṭallît qāṭān, 'small cloak'), under their clothing throughout the day. Another closed portion ends here.

As the reading continues, Moses instructs that if a man marries a woman, cohabits with her, takes an aversion to her, and falsely charges her with non-virginity at the time of marriage, the woman's parents were to produce a cloth with evidence of the woman's virginity before the town elders at the city gate. The community's elders were then to have the man flogged and fine him 100 shekels of silver to be paid to the woman's father. The woman was to remain the man's wife, and he was never to have the right to divorce her. A closed portion ends here. Moses instructed that if the elders found that the woman had not been a virgin, then the woman was to be brought to the entrance of her father's house and stoned to death by the men of her town. A closed portion ends here.

Moses next declares that if a man is found lying with another man's wife, both the man and the woman with whom he lay must be executed. Another closed portion ends here. Next, Moses teaches that if, in a city, a man lay with a virgin who was engaged to a man, the authorities were to take the two of them to the town gate and stone them to death: the girl because she did not cry for help—implying consent and infidelity even when there was already a compromise from her—and the man because he slept with another man's wife. A closed portion ends here.

Next, Moses instructs that if the man raped the woman in the open country, only the man was to die, as she cried for help and there was no one to save her. The law compared this vile act to a murderer. Another closed portion ends here. In the continuation of the reading, Moses instructed that if a man seized a virgin who was not engaged and lay with her, then the man was to pay the girl's father 50 shekels of silver; she was to become the man's wife, and he was never to have the right to divorce her. A closed portion ends here with the end of the chapter. As the reading continues in chapter 23, Moses instructed that no man could marry his father's former wife after his death. A closed portion ends here.

Moses next taught that in God's service, the Levites could not admit into membership anyone whose testicles were crushed or whose member was cut off. A closed portion ends here. Later in the reading, Moses explained that the Levites, the service-members in God's Tabernacle, were not allowed to include anyone born from illegitimate unions or within ten generations of such unions. Individuals in this category were known as mamzerim (מַמְזֵרִים, mamzērîm; sing. מַמְזֵר, mamzēr, 'illegitimate'). A closed portion ends here. Furthermore, Moses instructed that God's Levites could not admit into membership any Ammonite or Moabite, or anyone descended within ten generations from an Ammonite or Moabite. As long as they lived, Israelites were not to concern themselves with the welfare or benefit of Ammonites or Moabites, because they did not meet the Israelites with food and water after the Israelites left Ancient Egypt, and because they hired Balaam to curse the Israelites—but God refused to heed Balaam, turning his curse into a blessing. The third reading and a closed portion end here.

=== Fourth reading—Deuteronomy 23:8–24 ===
In the fourth reading, Moses told the Israelites not to despise the Edomites, because they were kin, nor the Egyptians, since the Israelites were strangers in Egypt. Great-grandchildren of Edomites or Egyptians could be welcomed into the community. A closed section ends here.

In the next part of the reading, Moses taught that any Israelite made unclean by a keri (קֶרִי, qerî, '[nocturnal] emission') had to leave the Israelite military camp, bathe in water toward evening, and rejoin the camp at sunset. The Israelites were to set aside an area outside the camp for relieving themselves, and carry a spike to dig a hole and cover their waste. As God moved around in their camp to protect them, the Israelites were to keep their camp sacred (קָדוֹשׁ, qādôš). A closed section ends here.

Next, Moses teaches that if a slave sought refuge with the Israelites, they were not to turn the slave over to the slave's master, but were to let the slave live wherever they chose and not mistreat them. A closed section ends here.

In the ongoing reading, Moses forbade the Israelites from engaging in prostitution—whether same-sex, opposite-sex, or for pagan temples—and from bringing prostitution wages into God's house to fulfill any vow. A closed section ends here.

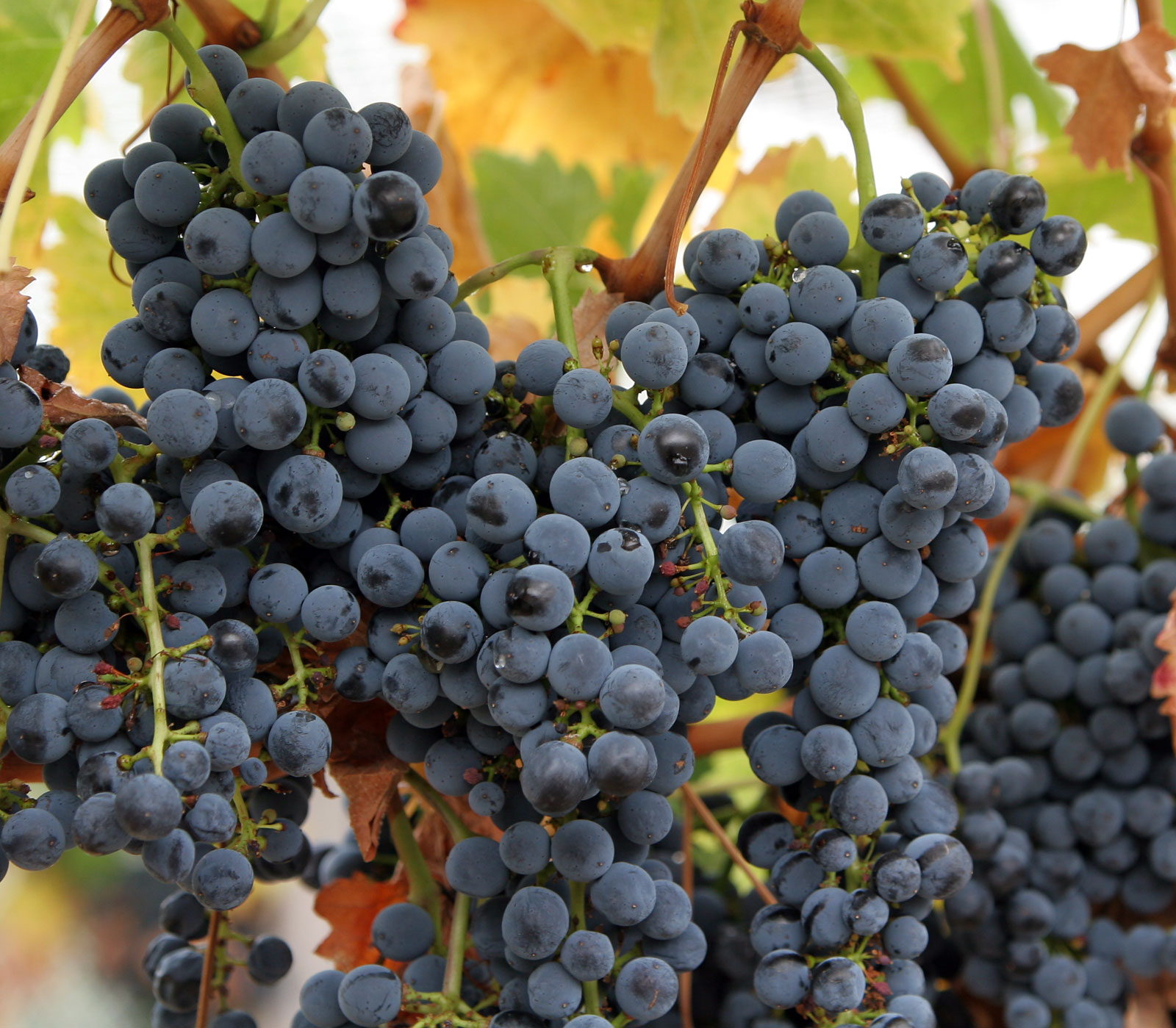
Grapes

In the continuation of the reading, Moses forbade the Israelites from charging interest on loans to their fellow citizens, but they could charge interest on loans to foreigners. A closed portion ends here.

In the continuation of the reading, Moses required the Israelites to fulfill their vows to God promptly, but they incurred no guilt if they chose not to vow. The fourth reading and a closed portion end here.

=== Fifth reading—Deuteronomy 23:25–24:4 ===
In the fifth reading, Moses permitted a worker in a vineyard to eat grapes until he was full, but the worker was not allowed to put any in a vessel. A closed portion ends here. As the reading continues, Moses permitted a worker in a field of standing grain to pluck ears by hand, but the worker was not allowed to cut the neighbor's grain with a sickle. A closed portion ends here with the end of the chapter.

As the reading continues in chapter 24, Moses taught that a divorced woman who remarried and then lost her second husband to divorce or death could not remarry her first husband. The fifth reading and a closed portion end here.

=== Sixth reading—Deuteronomy 24:5–13 ===
In the sixth reading, Moses exempted a newlywed man from army duty for one year to bring happiness to his wife. Israelites were not allowed to take a handmill or an upper millstone as pawn, because that would be taking someone's livelihood. A closed portion ends here. In the following part of the reading, Moses explained that anyone found guilty of kidnapping a fellow Israelite was to be put to death. A closed portion ends here. In the next section, Moses taught that when it comes to tzaraath (צָרַעַת, ṣāraʿat), an illness appearing on the skin, Israelites must follow the priests' instructions exactly, recalling that God caused Miriam's skin to be afflicted and later healed her after the Israelites left Egypt. A closed portion ends here. In the following part, Moses forbade an Israelite who lent to a fellow Israelite from entering the borrower's house to take a pledge, instead requiring the lender to stay outside. The borrower would bring the pledge out to the lender. If the borrower was in need, the lender was not allowed to sleep in the pledge but had to return it at sunset, allowing the borrower to sleep in the cloth and bless the lender before God. The sixth reading and a closed portion conclude here.

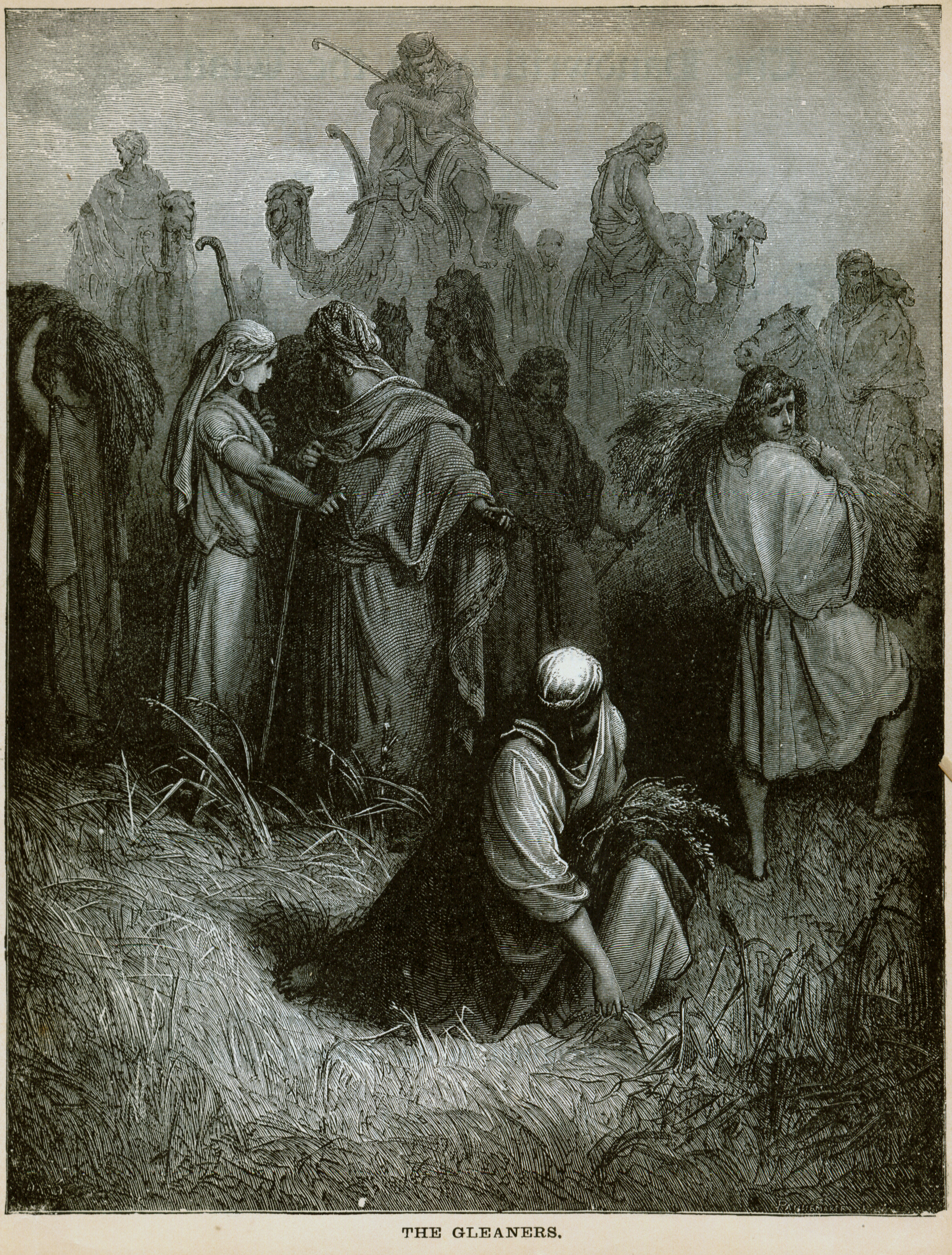
The Gleaners (engraving by Gustave Doré from the 1865 La Sainte Bible)

=== Seventh reading—Deuteronomy 24:14–25:19 ===
In the seventh reading, Moses forbade the Israelites to abuse a needy and destitute laborer, whether an Israelite or a stranger, and required them to pay the laborer's wages on the same day before the sun set, since the laborer would depend on them. A closed portion ends here.

In the continuation of the reading, Moses taught that parents were not to be put to death for children, nor were children to be put to death for parents; a person was to be put to death only for the person's own crime. A closed portion ends here.

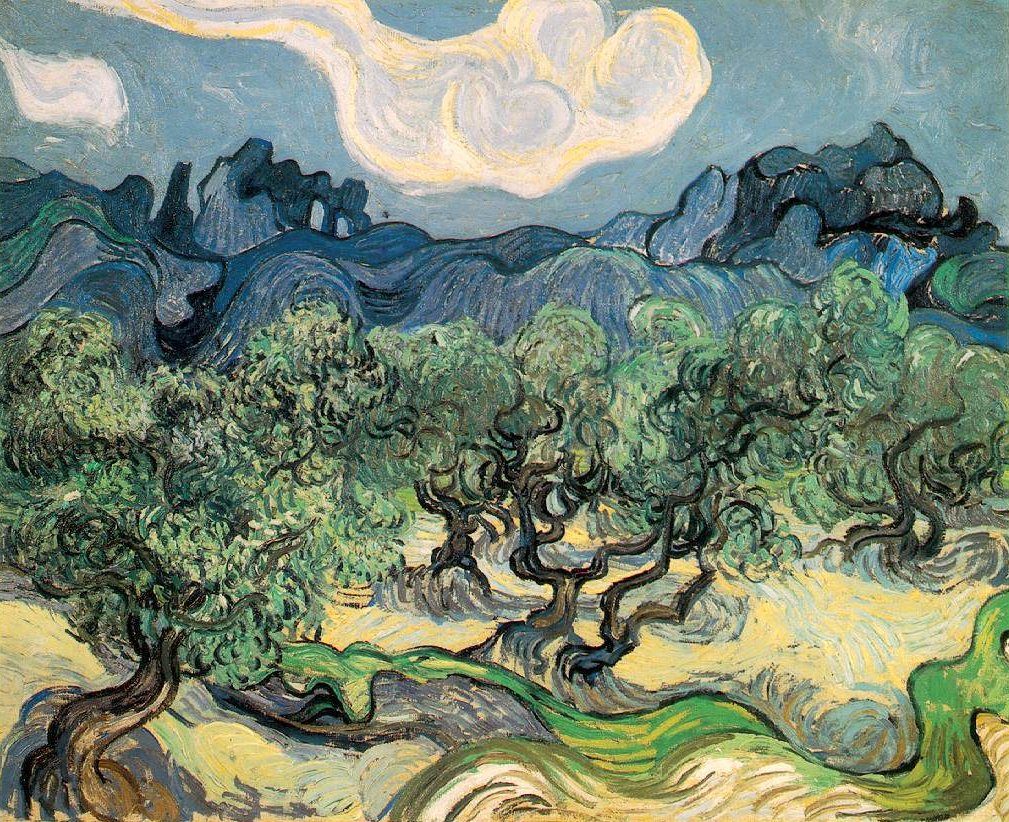
The Olive Trees (1889 painting by Vincent van Gogh)

In the continuation of the reading, Moses forbade the Israelites from subverting the rights of proselytes or orphans, and from taking a widow's garment in pawn, recalling that they were slaves in Egypt and that God redeemed them. A closed portion ends here.

Next, Moses instructed that when Israelites reaped their harvest and overlooked a sheaf, they should not go back to get it but leave it for the proselyte, the orphan, and the widow. A closed portion ends here.

Moses stated that when Israelites beat down the fruit of their olive trees or gathered grapes from their vineyards, they should not gather again, but leave what remains for the proselyte, the orphan, and the widow, remembering that they had once been slaves in Egypt. This concludes with the end of the chapter.

As the reading proceeds into chapter 25, Moses instructed that when someone was to be flogged, the local judge was to have the guilty person lie down and be whipped in his presence, as needed, but with no more than 40 lashes, so that the guilty person would not be humiliated. Israelites were prohibited from muzzling an ox while it was threshing. A closed portion ends here.

Continuing, Moses instructed that when siblings lived together, and one of them died without leaving a son, the surviving brother was to marry the widow as his yavam (יָבָם, yāvām, lit. 'levir'). The first son she bore was to be considered the deceased brother’s, so his name could carry on. If the surviving brother chose not to marry his brother's widow, he and his sister-in-law were to perform ḥalitzah (חֲלִיצָה, ḥălîṣāh, 'removal'). A closed portion ends here.

Next, Moses instructed that if two men fought and, to save her husband, a woman seized another man's genitals, her hand was to be cut off. A closed portion ends here.

Continuing, Moses forbade the use of dishonest weights and measures, both larger and smaller, insisting that they be honest and accurate. The lengthy first open portion concludes here.

==== Parashat Zachor ====
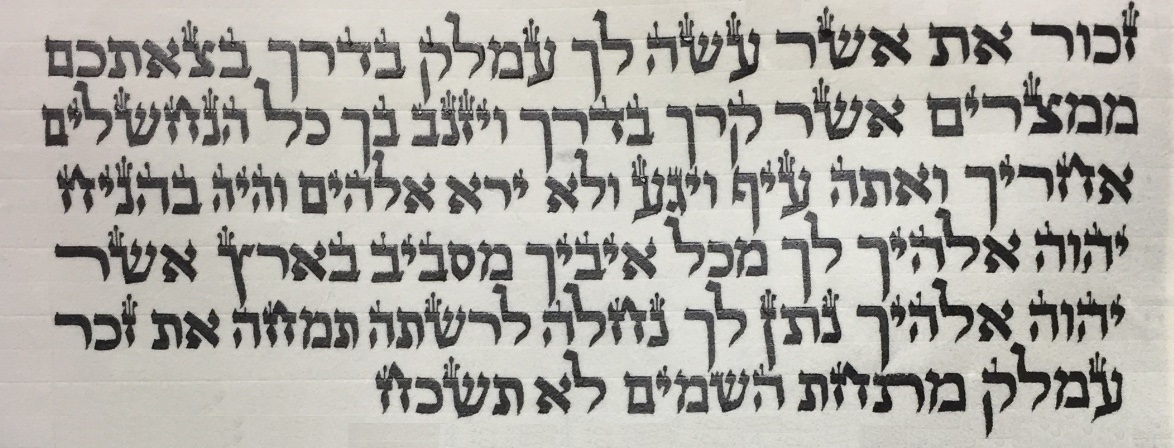
The maftir as it appears in a Torah scroll

The maftir reading (Deuteronomy 25:17–19) of the parasha, in which Moses enjoins the Israelites to remember what the Amalekites did to them on their journey after they left Egypt, is read on Shabbat Zakhor. The Israelites were enjoined never to forget to blot out the memory of Amalek from under heaven. The second open portion ends here with the end of the parashah.

=== Readings according to the triennial cycle ===
Jews who read the Torah according to the triennial cycle of Torah reading read the parashah according to the following schedule:

	Year 1	Year 2	Year 3
	2026, 2029, 2032 . . .	2027, 2030, 2033 . . .	2028, 2031, 2034 . . .
Reading	21:10–23:7	23:8–24:13	24:14–25:19
1	21:10–14	23:8–12	24:14–16
2	21:15–17	23:13–15	24:17–19
3	21:18–21	23:16–19	24:20–22
4	21:22–22:7	23:20–24	25:1–4
5	22:8–12	23:25–24:4	25:5–10
6	22:13–29	24:5–9	25:11–16
7	23:1–7	24:10–13	25:17–19
Maftir	23:4–7	24:10–13	25:17–19

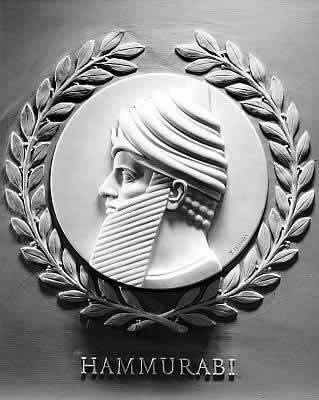
Hammurabi

== In ancient parallels ==
The parashah has parallels in these ancient sources:

=== Deuteronomy chapter 25 ===
Presaging the injunction of Deuteronomy 25:13–16 for honest weights and measures, the Code of Hammurabi decreed that if merchants used a light scale to measure the grain or the silver that they lent and a heavy scale to measure the grain or the silver that they collected, then they were to forfeit their investment.

== In inner-biblical interpretation ==
The parashah has parallels or is discussed in these Biblical sources:

=== Deuteronomy chapters 12–26 ===
Benjamin Sommer argued that Deuteronomy 12–26 borrowed whole sections from the earlier text of Exodus 21–23.

=== Deuteronomy chapter 21 ===
Paralleling the "double portion" to be inherited by the firstborn son according to Deuteronomy 21:17, in his last testament, Jacob told Joseph, "I give you one portion more than your brothers."

The punishment of being stoned outside the city, prescribed in Deuteronomy 21:21 for a stubborn and rebellious son who is unmoved by discipline, was also the punishment prescribed for blasphemy toward the name of the Lord in Leviticus 24:16 and 23. The Jamieson-Fausset-Brown Bible Commentary suggests that "parents are considered God's representatives and invested with a portion of his authority over their children", and, therefore, refusal to obey the voice of one's parents, when they have chastened one, is akin to refusal to honor the name of God. Proverbs 23:20 uses the same words—"a glutton and a drunkard"—as Deuteronomy 21:20, which Proverbs 23:22 links to the need for obedience to and respect for one's parents: "Listen to your father who begot you, and do not despise your mother when she is old."

=== Deuteronomy chapter 22 ===
The instruction in Exodus 23:5, which parallels Deuteronomy 22:4, states that the duty to restore a fallen donkey or ox applies to one's enemy's animals as well as to one's brother's.

=== Deuteronomy chapter 23 ===
Deuteronomy 23:4 recalls the Moabites' refusal to meet the Israelites with bread and water. Deuteronomy 2:27–30 records the Israelites' request for safe passage and supplies through the land of the Moabites. Genesis 19:37–38 is the first mention of the Moabites, reporting that they descended from Lot. Their exclusion in Deuteronomy 23:3 from the Israelite congregation, "to their tenth generation, shall they not enter into the congregation of the Lord forever," was apparently understood as in force in Nehemiah's time (more than ten generations from the occupation of Canaan). The text of Deuteronomy 23:4 was read in Nehemiah 13:1–2 when the post-exilic Second Temple was dedicated.

In Jeremiah 15:10, the prophet said that he had "neither lent for interest, nor have men lent to [him] for interest" in violation of Deuteronomy 23:19–20.

=== Deuteronomy chapter 24 ===
Deuteronomy 24:6, 10–13, and 17 regulate creditors' seizing of collateral pledged in exchange for loans. Looking from the other side of the transaction, Proverbs 6:1–5; 11:15; 17:18; 22:26–27; and 27:13 counsel against making pledges. Both sets of texts thus indicate the misfortune that creditors must have inflicted on borrowers and sureties in the Hebrew Biblical era. Related property discussions appear in Exodus 22:6–7 (property left in trust); Nehemiah 5:3–5 (pawning, borrowing against collateral); Proverbs 20:16 (seizing collateral); and Amos 2:8 (seized collateral).

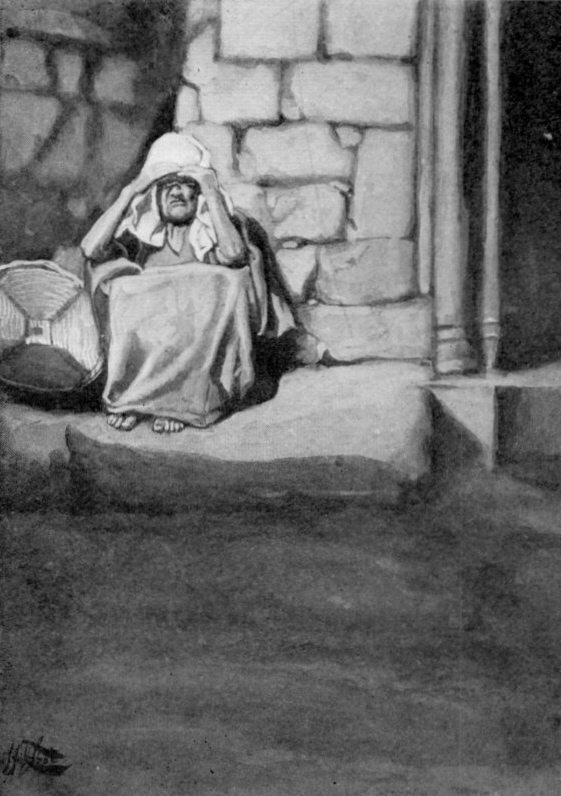
Miriam Shut Out from the Camp (watercolor circa 1896–1902 by James Tissot)

The Hebrew Bible reports skin disease (tzaraat) and a person affected by skin disease (מְּצֹרָע, meṣōrāʿ, 'one afflicted [by leprosy]') at several places, often (and sometimes incorrectly) translated as "leprosy" and "a leper." In Exodus 4:6, to help Moses convince others that God had sent him, God instructed Moses to put his hand into his bosom, and when he took it out, his hand was "leprous (מְצֹרַעַת, meṣōraʿat, lit. 'afflicted one (fem.)'), as white as snow." In Leviticus 13–14, the Torah sets out regulations for skin disease and a person affected by skin disease. In Numbers 12:10, after Miriam spoke against Moses, God's cloud removed from the Tent of Meeting and "Miriam was leprous (m'tzora'at), as white as snow." In the current parashah, Moses warned the Israelites to observe all that the priests would teach them, remembering what God did to Miriam (Deuteronomy 24:8–9). In 2 Kings 5:1–19, part of the haftarah for parashat Tazria, the prophet Elisha cures Naaman, the commander of the army of the king of Aram, who was a "leper" (metzora). In 2 Kings 7:3–20, part of the haftarah for parashat Metzora, the story is told of four "leprous men" (מְצֹרָעִים, meṣōrāʿîm) at the gate during the Aramaeans' siege of Samaria. And in 2 Chronicles 26:19, after King Uzziah tried to burn incense in the Temple in Jerusalem, "leprosy broke forth on his forehead."

Deuteronomy 24:14–15 and 17–22 admonish the Israelites not to wrong the stranger, for "you shall remember that you were a bondman in Egypt." Similar commands are recorded in Exodus 22:20 and 23:9; Leviticus 19:33–34; Deuteronomy 1:16, 10:17–19, and 27:19.) Similarly, in Amos 3:1, the 8th-century BCE prophet Amos anchored his pronouncements in the covenant community's Exodus history, saying, "Hear this word that the Lord has spoken against you, O children of Israel, against the whole family that I brought up out of the land of Egypt."

In Isaiah 12:10, the prophet used the practice of leaving olives on the boughs and grapes in the vineyard for gleanings (as required by Deuteronomy 24:20–21) as a sign of hope for Israel when he forecast the nation's downfall: "In that day it shall come to pass that the glory of Jacob will wane ... yet gleaning grapes will be left in it, like the shaking of an olive tree, two or three olives at the top of the uppermost bough, four or five in its most fruitful branches."

=== Deuteronomy chapter 25 ===
The duty of a brother pursuant to Deuteronomy 25:5–10 to perform a Levirate marriage (יִבּוּם, yibbûm) with the wife of a deceased brother is reflected in the stories of Tamar in Genesis 38:6–11 and Ruth in Ruth 1:5–11, 3:12, and 4:1–12. Proverbs 11:1 echoes the teaching of Deuteronomy 25:15–16 that dishonest scales are an abomination to God.

The Israelites' victory over the Amalekites and the role of Moses, supported by Aaron and Hur in directing the battle's outcome, was recorded in Exodus 17:8–16, but the Exodus narrative does not mention the Amalekites' tactics (reported in Deuteronomy 25:18) of attacking the "faint and weary" at the rear of the Israelites' convoy. Exodus 17:14 and Deuteronomy 25:17 both speak of blotting out the memory of Amalek.

In 1 Samuel 15:1–3, the prophet Samuel conveys the command of God to King Saul to "punish Amalek for what he did to Israel". Saul "utterly destroyed" the Amalekites; initially he spared Agag their king, but Samuel killed him later.

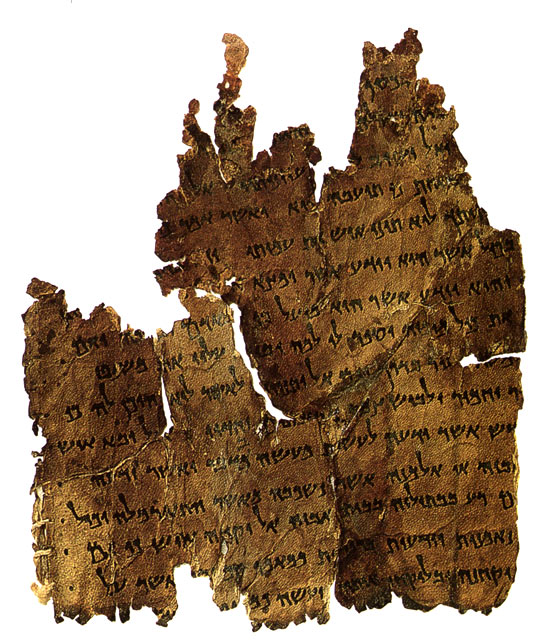
A Damascus Document Scroll found at Qumran

== In early nonrabbinic interpretation ==
The parashah has parallels or is discussed in these early nonrabbinic sources:

=== Deuteronomy chapter 23 ===
The Damascus Document of the Qumran Jewish sect prohibited non-cash transactions with Jews outside the sect. Lawrence Schiffman interprets this rule as an effort to prevent violations of the prohibition on taking interest from fellow Jews found in Exodus 22:25, Leviticus 25:36–37, and Deuteronomy 23:19–20. It seems the sect regarded common credit-based business practices as breaking these laws.

Philo read Deuteronomy 23:22 (Note: When you make a vow to the ETERNAL your God, do not put off fulfilling it, for the ETERNAL your God will require it of you, and you will have incurred guilt" (Revised JPS Version).) as a call for the Israelites to be quick in expressing their gratitude to God. Philo cited Cain as an example of a "self-loving man" who, in Genesis 4:3, showed his gratitude to God too slowly. Philo taught that Jews should hurry to please God without delay, arguing that a vow is a request to God for good things. Deuteronomy 23:22 thus enjoins that, upon receiving them, one must offer gratitude to God as soon as possible.

Philo divided those who fail to do so into three types:

1. Those who forget the benefits that they have received.
2. Those who, from an excessive conceit, look upon themselves and not God as the authors of what they receive.
3. Those who realize that God caused what they received, but still say that they deserved it because they are worthy to receive God's favor.

Philo taught that the Hebrew Bible opposes all three attitudes, citing Deuteronomy 8:12–14 as an example of the first group who forget, warning: "Take care, lest when you have eaten and are filled, and when you have built fine houses and inhabited them, and when your flocks and your herds have increased, and when your silver and gold, and all that you possess is multiplied, you be lifted up in your heart, and forget the LORD your

." Philo asserted that one does not forget God when one recognizes one's own nullity and God's supreme greatness. He interpreted Deuteronomy 8:17 as a reprimand to those who credit themselves with their achievements, reminding them: "Say not my own might, or the strength of my right hand has acquired me all this power, but remember always the LORD your

, who gives you the might to acquire power." Furthermore, Philo explained Deuteronomy 9:4–5 in reference to individuals who believe they deserve their possessions, stating, "You do not enter into this land to possess it because of your righteousness, or because of the holiness of your heart; but, primarily, because of the iniquity of these nations, since God has brought about their destruction due to wickedness; and second, to uphold the covenant He swore to our ancestors." Philo interpreted the term "covenant" metaphorically to signify God's graces. Therefore, Philo concluded that by eschewing forgetfulness, ingratitude, and self-love, Jews can avoid missing the true worship of God through negligence. Instead, the adherent would encounter God having prepared themself to fulfill his commandments.

A manuscript from Qumran Cave 4, probably dated to the turn of the common era, deduced from Deuteronomy 23:25–26 that a poor person could eat ears of corn in the field of another person, but was not allowed to take any home. On a threshing-floor, however, the poor person could both eat and gather provisions for his family.

== In classical rabbinic interpretation ==
The parashah is discussed in sources from the Rabbinic period:

=== Deuteronomy chapter 21 ===
==== Deuteronomy 21:10–14—the beautiful captive ====
The Gemara taught that Deuteronomy 21:10–14 provided a law for taking a beautiful captive woman only as an allowance for human passions. The Rabbis taught in a baraita (Jewish Babylonian Aramaic: בָּרַיְתָא, romanized: bārayṯā, lit. 'external [teaching]') that taking beautiful captives according to the strictures of Deuteronomy 21:10–14 was better than taking beautiful women captive without restriction, just as it was better for Jews to eat the meat of a ritually slaughtered ill animal than to eat the meat of an ill animal that had died on its own. The Rabbis interpreted the words, "and you see among the captives" in Deuteronomy 21:11 to mean that the provisions applied only if the soldier set his eye upon the woman when taking her captive, not later. They interpreted the words "a woman" in Deuteronomy 21:11 to mean that the provisions applied even to a woman who was married before having been taken captive. They interpreted the words, "and you have a desire" in Deuteronomy 21:11 to mean that the provisions applied even if the woman was not beautiful. They interpreted the word "her" in Deuteronomy 21:11 to mean that the provisions allowed him to take her alone, not her and her companion. They interpreted the words "and you shall take" in Deuteronomy 21:11 to mean that the soldier could have marital rights over her. They interpreted the words "to you to wife" in Deuteronomy 21:11 to mean that the soldier could not take two women, one for himself and another for his father, or one for himself and another for his son. And they interpreted the words "then you shall bring her home" in Deuteronomy 21:12 to mean that the soldier could not molest her on the battlefield. Abba Arika (a.k.a. Rav) said that Deuteronomy 21:10–14 permitted a priest to take a beautiful captive, while Samuel of Nehardea maintained that it was forbidden.

A baraita taught that the words of Deuteronomy 21:10, "And you carry them away captive," were meant to include Canaanites who lived outside the land of Israel, teaching that if they repented, they would be accepted.

The Gemara taught that the procedure of Deuteronomy 21:12–13 applied only when the captive did not accept the commandments, for if she accepted the commandments, then she could be immersed in a mikveh (מִקְוֶה, miqveh, 'gathering [of water]'), and she and the soldier could marry immediately. Rabbi Eliezer ben Hurcanus interpreted the words "and she shall shave her head and do her nails" in Deuteronomy 21:12 to mean that she was to cut her nails, but Rabbi Akiva interpreted the words to mean that she was to let them grow. Rabbi Eliezer reasoned that Deuteronomy 21:12 specified an act with respect to the head and an act with respect to the nails, and as the former meant removal, so should the latter. Rabbi Akiva reasoned that Deuteronomy 21:12 specified disfigurement for the head, so it must mean disfigurement for the nails, as well.

Rabbi Eliezer interpreted the words "bewail her father and her mother" in Deuteronomy 21:13 to mean her actual father and mother. But Rabbi Akiva interpreted the words as referring to idolatry, citing Jeremiah 2:27. A baraita taught that "a full month" meant 30 days. But Rabbi Simeon ben Eleazar interpreted Deuteronomy 21:13 to call for 90 days—30 days for "month," 30 days for "full," and 30 days for "and after that." Rabina said that one could say that "month" meant 30 days, "full" meant 30 days, and "and after that" meant an equal number (30 plus 30) again, for a total of 120 days.

==== Deuteronomy 21:15–17—inheritance among the sons of two wives ====
The Mishnah and the Talmud interpreted the laws of the firstborn's inheritance in Deuteronomy 21:15–17 in tractates Bava Batra and Bekhorot. The Mishnah interpreted Deuteronomy 21:17 to teach that a son and a daughter have equal inheritance rights, except that a firstborn son takes a double portion in his father's estate but does not take a double portion in his mother's estate. The Mishnah taught that they disregarded a father who said, "My firstborn son shall not inherit a double portion," or "My son shall not inherit with his brothers," because the father's stipulation would be contrary to Deuteronomy 21:17. But a father could distribute his property as gifts during his lifetime so that one son received more than another, or so that the firstborn received merely an equal share, so long as the father did not try to make these conveyances as an inheritance upon his death.

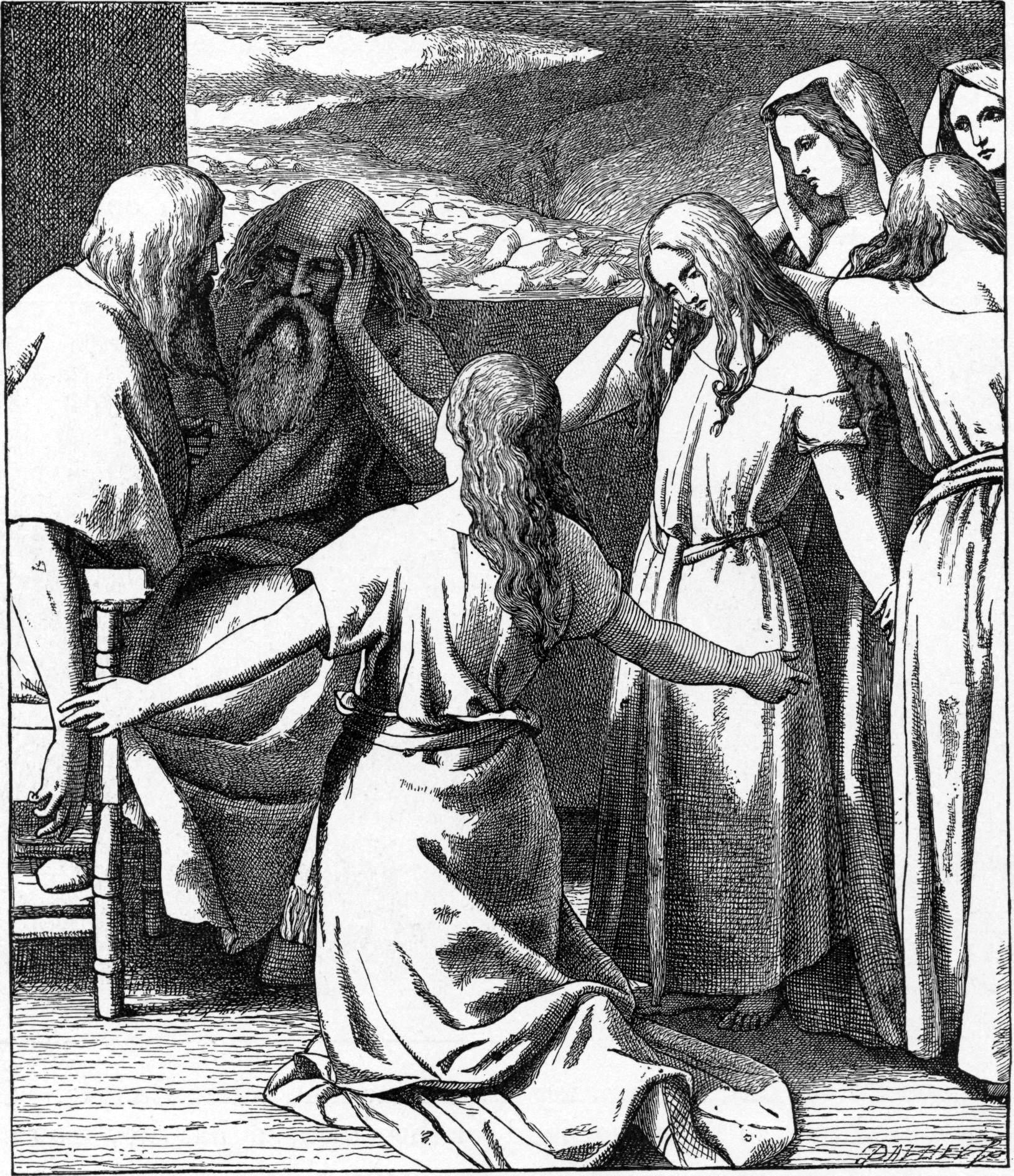
The Daughters of Zelophehad (illustration from the 1897 Bible Pictures and What They Teach Us by Charles Foster)

The Gemara recounted a discussion regarding the right of the firstborn in Deuteronomy 21:17. Once Rabbi Jannai was walking, leaning on the shoulder of Rabbi Simlai, his attendant, and Rabbi Judah the Prince came to meet them. Rabbi Judah the Prince asked Rabbi Jannai what the Scriptural basis was for the proposition that a son takes precedence over a daughter in the inheritance of a mother's estate. Rabbi Jannai replied that the plural use of the term "tribes" in the discussion of the inheritance of the daughters of Zelophehad in Numbers 36:8 indicates that the mother's tribe is to be compared to the father's tribe, and as in the case of the father's tribe, a son takes precedence over a daughter, so in the case of the mother's tribe, a son should take precedence over a daughter. Rabbi Judah the Prince challenged Rabbi Jannai, saying that if this were so, one could say that, as in the case of the father's tribe, a firstborn takes a double portion; so, in the case of the mother's tribe, would a firstborn take a double portion? Rabbi Jannai dismissed the remark of Rabbi Judah the Prince. The Gemara then inquired why a firstborn son receives a double share in his father's estate but not in his mother's. Abaye replied that Deuteronomy 21:17 says, "of all that he [the father] has," implying all that "he" (the father) has and not all that "she" (the mother) has. The Gemara asked whether the proposition that a firstborn son takes a double portion only in the estate of his father might apply only in the case where a bachelor married a widow (who had children from her first marriage, and thus the father's firstborn son was not that of the mother). And thus, where a bachelor married a virgin (so that the firstborn son of the father would also be the firstborn son of the mother), might the firstborn son also take a double portion in his mother's estate?

Rav Nachman bar Yitzchak replied that Deuteronomy 21:17 says, "for he [the firstborn son] is the firstfruits of his [the father's] strength," from which we can infer that the law applies to the firstfruits of the father's strength and not the firstfruits of the mother's strength. The Gemara replied that Deuteronomy 21:17 teaches that though a son was born after a miscarriage (and thus did not "open the womb" and is not regarded as a firstborn son for purposes of "sanctification to the Lord" and "redemption from the priest" in Exodus 13:2), he is nonetheless regarded as the firstborn son for purposes of inheritance. Deuteronomy 21:17 thus implies that only the son for whom the father's heart grieves is included in the law, but a miscarriage, for which the father's heart does not grieve, is excluded. (And thus, since Deuteronomy 21:17 is necessary for this deduction, it could not have been meant for the proposition that the law applies to the firstfruits of the father's strength and not of the mother's strength.) But then the Gemara reasoned that if Deuteronomy 21:17 is necessary for excluding miscarriages, then Deuteronomy 21:17 should have read, "for he is the firstfruits of strength." Still, Deuteronomy 21:17 in fact says, "his strength." Thus one may deduce two laws from Deuteronomy 21:17. But the Gemara objected further that still that the words of Deuteronomy 21:17, "the firstfruits of his [the father's] strength," not her strength, might apply only to the case of a widower (who had children from his first wife) who married a virgin (since the first son from the second marriage would be only the wife's firstborn, not the husband's). But where a bachelor married a virgin (and thus the son would be the firstborn of both the father and the mother), the firstborn son might take a double portion also in his mother's estate. But Rava concluded that Deuteronomy 21:17 states, "the right of the firstborn is his [the father's]," and this indicates that the right of the firstborn applies to a man's estate and not to a woman's.

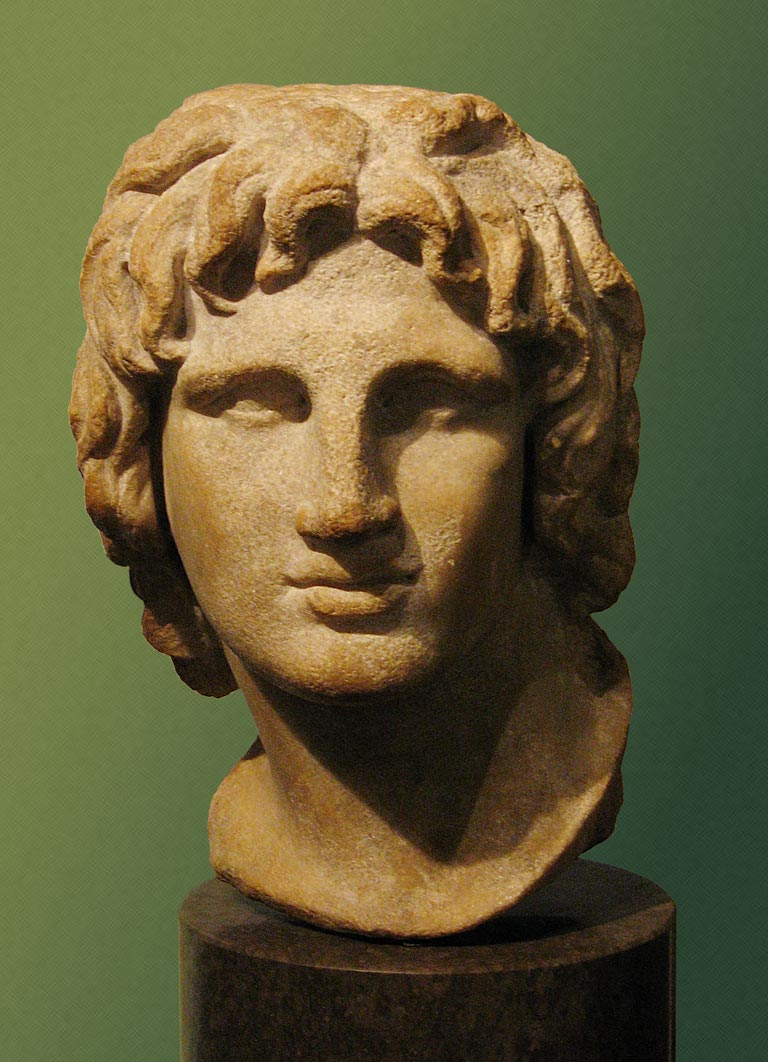
Alexander the Great (Hellenistic marble bust of the 2nd–1st century BCE in the British Museum)

A midrash tells that the Ishmaelites came before Alexander the Great to dispute Israel's birthright, accompanied by the Canaanites and the Egyptians. The Ishmaelites based their claim on Deuteronomy 21:17, "But he shall acknowledge the firstborn, the son of the hated," and Ishmael was the firstborn. Gebiah, the son of Kosem, representing the Jews, asked Alexander whether a man could do as he wished with his sons. When Alexander replied that a man could, Gebiah quoted Genesis 25:5, "And Abraham gave all that he had to Isaac." The Ishmaelites asked where the deed of gift to his other sons was. Gebiah replied by quoting Genesis 25:7, "But to the sons of the concubines, whom Abraham had, Abraham gave gifts." Thereupon the Ishmaelites departed in shame.

==== Deuteronomy 21:18–21—the wayward son ====
Chapter 8 of tractate Sanhedrin in the Mishnah and Babylonian Talmud interpreted the laws of the wayward and rebellious son (בֵּן סוֹרֵר וּמוֹרֶה, ben sorer umoreh) in Deuteronomy 21:18–21. A baraita taught that there never was a "stubborn and rebellious son" and never would be, and that Deuteronomy 21:18–21 was written merely that we might study it and receive reward for the studying (see also under Ir nidachat). But Rabbi Jonathan said that he saw a stubborn and rebellious son and sat on his grave.

The Mishnah interpreted the words "a son" in Deuteronomy 21:18 to teach that the provision applied to "a son" but not to a daughter, and to "a son" but not to a full-grown man. The Mishnah exempted a minor because minors did not come within the scope of the commandments. And the Mishnah deduced that a boy became liable to being considered "a stubborn and rebellious son" from the time that he grew two genital pubic hairs until his pubic hair grew around his genitalia. Rav Judah taught in Rav's name that Deuteronomy 21:18 implied that the son had to be nearly a man.

The Mishnah interpreted the words of Deuteronomy 21:20 to exclude from designation as a "stubborn and rebellious son" a boy who had a parent with any of a number of physical characteristics. The Mishnah interpreted the words "then his father and his mother shall lay hold on him" to exclude a boy if one of his parents had a hand or fingers cut off. The Mishnah interpreted the words "and bring him out" to exclude a boy who had a lame parent. The Mishnah interpreted the words, "and they shall say" to exclude a boy who had a parent who could not speak. The Mishnah interpreted the words "this our son" to exclude a boy who had a blind parent. The Mishnah interpreted the words "he will not obey our voice" to exclude a boy who had a deaf parent.

==== Deuteronomy 21:22–23—dignity in death ====
Interpreting Deuteronomy 21:22–23, the Mishnah taught that they would hang a transgressor for only a very short time, and then immediately untie the corpse. The Mishnah taught that leaving the corpse hanging overnight would transgress Deuteronomy 21:22 and desecrate the name of Heaven, reminding everybody of the deceased's transgression. The Tosefta taught that to fulfill the commandment of hanging the transgressor, one person tied as another person untied. Reading Deuteronomy 21:23, Rabbi Meir compared the situation to two brothers who were very similar to each other. One was the master of the whole world, and the other was a bandit. They caught the bandit and crucified him, and everyone who passed by said that it seemed as though the master had been crucified! Therefore, Deuteronomy 21:23 says, "he that is hanged is a reproach to God." In the Babylonian Talmud, Rabbi Meir compared it to two brothers who were twins and lived in the same city. One was appointed king, while the other became a bandit. The king commanded that his brother be punished, and they hanged the bandit brother for his crimes. Anyone who saw the bandit hanging would say that the king had been hanged. The king, therefore, commanded that his brother be taken down. In the Mishnah, Rabbi Meir said that the phrase in Deuteronomy 21:23, "for he that is hung is a curse (קִלְלַת, kilelat) of God," should be understood to tell that when a transgressor suffers in the wake of the transgressor's sin, the Divine Presence says, "I am distressed (קַלַנִי, kallani) about My head, I am distressed about My arm," meaning, "I, too, suffer when the wicked are punished." If God suffers such distress over the blood of the wicked, even though they justly deserved their punishment, one can infer a fortiori that God suffers distress over the blood of the righteous.

=== Deuteronomy chapter 22 ===
The first two chapters of Tractate Bava Metzia in the Mishnah, Tosefta, Jerusalem Talmud, and Babylonian Talmud interpreted the laws of lost property in Deuteronomy 22:1–3. The Mishnah read the reference to "your brother's ox or his sheep" in Deuteronomy 22:1 to apply to any domestic animal. The Mishnah read the emphatic words of Deuteronomy 22:1, "you shall surely return them," repeating the verb "return" in the Hebrew, to teach that Deuteronomy 22:1 required a person to return a neighbor's animal again and again, even if the animal kept running away four or five times. And Rava taught that Deuteronomy 22:1 required a person to return the animal even a hundred times. If one found an identifiable item and the identity of the owner was unknown, the Mishnah taught that the finder was required to announce it. Rabbi Meir taught that the finder was obliged to announce it until his neighbors could know of it. Rabbi Judah maintained that the finder had to announce it until three festivals had passed plus an additional seven days after the last festival, allowing three days for going home, three days for returning, and one day for announcing.

A baraita cited among affirmative precepts not limited to time, those regarding returning lost property in Deuteronomy 22:1–3, the dismissal of the mother bird in Deuteronomy 22:6–7, and the building of fences around accessible roofs in Deuteronomy 22:8.

Rava taught that Deuteronomy 22:3, "And so shall you do with every lost item of your brother," imposes an obligation to protect one's brother from losing his land. Rav Ḥananya replied that a baraita taught that if one saw water flowing toward inundating another's field, one must establish a barrier before the water to preserve the other's field.

The Mishnah read the emphatic words of Exodus 23:5 and Deuteronomy 22:4 to teach that these verses required people to help lift a neighbor's animal, even if it fell again and again, up to five times. If the owner sat down and said, "Since the commandment is on you, if you wish to unload, unload," one was not obligated, for Exodus 23:5 says "with him." But if the owner was aged or sick, one was obligated to lift even without the owner's help. The Gemara concluded that Exodus 23:5 and Deuteronomy 22:4 require people to prevent suffering to animals. And the Gemara argued that when the Mishnah exempts the passerby when the owner does not participate in unloading the burden, it means that the passerby is exempt from unloading the burden for free, but is obligated to do so for remuneration.

Chapter 12 of tractate Chullin in the Mishnah and Babylonian Talmud interpreted the laws of sending the mother bird away from the nest (שילוח הקן, shiluach hakein) in Deuteronomy 22:6–7. The Mishnah read Deuteronomy 22:6–7 to require a person to let the mother bird go again and again, even if the mother bird kept coming back to the nest four or five times. And the Gemara taught that Deuteronomy 22:6–7 required a person to let the mother bird go even a hundred times.

The Mishnah taught that they silenced (for uttering an unacceptable prayer) one who prayed that God extend God's mercy to us, just as Deuteronomy 22:6–7 extends God's mercy to a bird's nest.

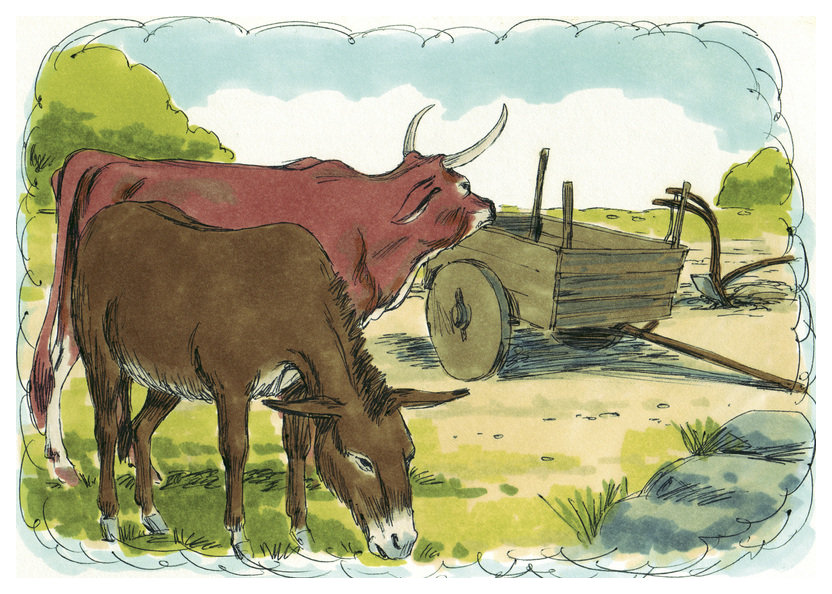
"You shall not plow with an ox and an ass together." (Deuteronomy 22:10) (1984 illustration by Jim Padgett, courtesy of Sweet Publishing)

Tractate Kilayim in the Mishnah, Tosefta, and Jerusalem Talmud interpreted the laws of separating diverse species in Deuteronomy 22:9–11.

The Mishnah used the prohibitions in Deuteronomy 22:9, 22:10, and 22:11 to illustrate how one action could violate up to nine separate commandments. One could (1) plow with an ox and a donkey yoked together (in violation of Deuteronomy 22:10) (2 and 3) that are two animals dedicated to the sanctuary, (4) plowing mixed seeds sown in a vineyard (in violation of Deuteronomy 22:9), (5) during a Sabbatical year (in violation of Leviticus 25:4), (6) on a Festival-day (in violation of, for example, Leviticus 23:7), (7) when the plower is a priest (in violation of Leviticus 21:1) and (8) a Nazirite (in violation of Numbers 6:6) plowing in a contaminated place. Ḥanina ben Ḥakinai said that the plowman also may have been wearing a garment of wool and linen (in violation of Leviticus 19:19 and Deuteronomy 22:11). They said to him that this would not be in the same category as the other violations. He replied that the Nazirite is not in the same category as the other violations.

Rabbi Joshua of Siknin taught in the name of Rabbi Levi that the Evil Inclination criticizes four laws as without logical basis. Scripture uses the expression "statute" (חֹק, chok) in connection with each: the laws of (1) a brother's wife (in Deuteronomy 25:5–10), (2) mingled kinds (in Leviticus 19:19 and Deuteronomy 22:11), (3) the scapegoat (in Leviticus 16), and (4) the red cow (in Numbers 19).

Leviticus 18:4 calls on the Israelites to obey God's "statutes" (חֻקִּים, chukim) and "ordinances" (מִּשְׁפָּטִים, mishpatim). The Rabbis in a baraita taught that the "ordinances" (מִּשְׁפָּטִים, mishpatim) were commandments that logic would have dictated that we follow even had Scripture not commanded them, like the laws concerning idolatry, adultery, bloodshed, robbery, and blasphemy. And "statutes" (חֻקִּים, chukim) were commandments that the Adversary challenges us to violate as beyond reason, like those relating to שַׁעַטְנֵז, shaatnez (in Leviticus 19:19 and Deuteronomy 22:11); חליצה, ḥalitzah (in Deuteronomy 25:5–10); purification of the person with skin disease, צָּרַעַת, tzara'at (in Leviticus 14), and the scapegoat (in Leviticus 16). So that people do not think these "ordinances" (מִּשְׁפָּטִים, mishpatim) to be empty acts, in Leviticus 18:4, God says, "I am the Lord," indicating that the Lord made these statutes, and we have no right to question them.

Similarly, reading Leviticus 18:4, "My ordinances (מִשְׁפָּטַי, mishpatai) shall you do, and My statutes (חֻקֹּתַי, chukotai) shall you keep," the Sifra distinguished "ordinances" (מִשְׁפָּטִים, mishpatim) from "statutes" (חֻקִּים, chukim). The term "ordinances" (מִשְׁפָּטִים, mishpatim), taught the Sifra, refers to rules that, even had they not been written in the Torah, it would have been entirely logical to write them, like laws pertaining to theft, sexual immorality, idolatry, blasphemy, and murder. The term "statutes" (חֻקִּים, chukim), taught the Sifra, refers to those rules that the impulse to do evil (יצר הרע, yetzer hara) and the nations of the world try to undermine, like eating pork (prohibited by Leviticus 11:7 and Deuteronomy 14:7–8), wearing wool-linen mixtures (שַׁעַטְנֵז, shatnez, prohibited by Leviticus 19:19 and Deuteronomy 22:11), release from levirate marriage (חליצה, chalitzah, mandated by Deuteronomy 25:5–10), purification of a person affected by skin disease (מְּצֹרָע, metzora, regulated in Leviticus 13–14), and the goat sent off into the wilderness (the scapegoat, regulated in Leviticus 16). Regarding these, as taught in the Sifra, the Torah simply states that God legislated them, and we have no right to question them.

Rabbi Eleazar ben Azariah taught that people should not say that they do not want to wear a wool-linen mixture (שַׁעַטְנֵז, shatnez, prohibited by Leviticus 19:19 and Deuteronomy 22:11), eat pork (prohibited by Leviticus 11:7 and Deuteronomy 14:7–8), or be intimate with forbidden partners (prohibited by Leviticus 18 and 20), but rather should say that they would love to, but God has decreed that they not do so. For in Leviticus 20:26, God says, "I have separated you from the nations to be mine." So one should separate from transgression and accept the rule of Heaven.

The Mishnah taught that the fines for rape, seduction, the husband who falsely accused his bride of not having been a virgin (as in Deuteronomy 22:19), and any judicial court matter are not canceled by the Sabbatical year.

Chapter 3 of the tractate Ketubot in the Mishnah, Tosefta, and Babylonian Talmud interprets the laws regarding seducers and rapists in Deuteronomy 22:25–29.

=== Deuteronomy chapter 23 ===
Interpreting Deuteronomy 23:4, "An Ammonite or a Moabite shall not enter into the assembly of the Lord," the Mishnah taught that whereas an Ammonite and a Moabite are forbidden to enter into the congregation of Israel, their women are permitted immediately (following conversion). The Babylonian Talmud reported that Rava said that this tradition came from the prophet Samuel, and it thus allowed David (whom Ruth 4:13–22 reports descended from Ruth the Moabite) and his family to marry into the Israelite congregation.

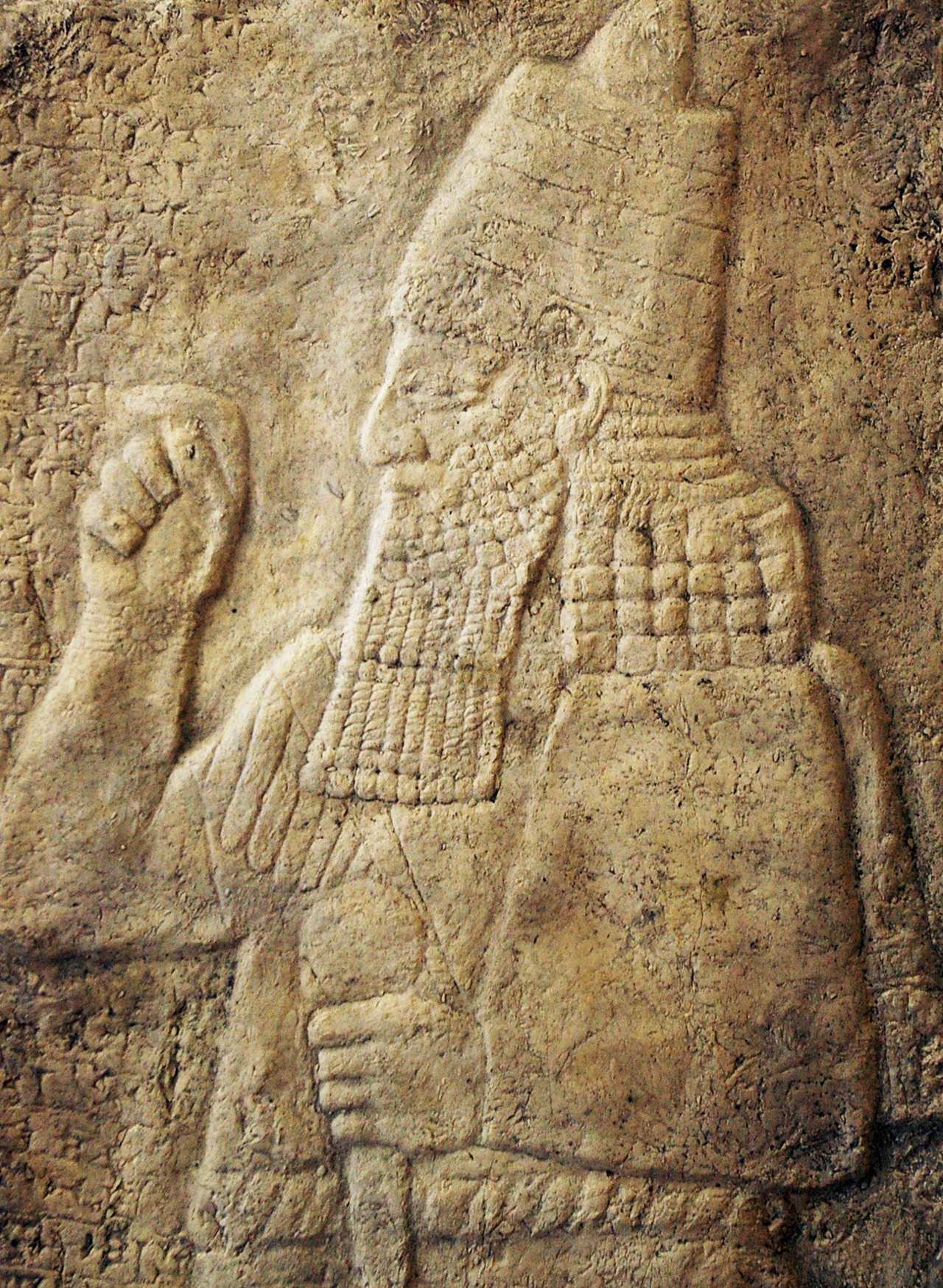
Sennacherib (cast of a rock relief from the foot of Cudi Dağı, near Cizre)

Elsewhere, the Mishnah reported that an Ammonite convert named Judah came to the house of study and asked to join the assembly. Rabban Gamaliel forbade him, but Rabbi Joshua permitted him. Rabban Gamaliel quoted Deuteronomy 23:4, "An Ammonite or a Moabite shall not enter into the assembly of the Lord." But Rabbi Joshua asked whether the Ammonites or Moabites were still in their own territory, as Sennacherib, the king of Assyria, had long before conquered and mingled all the nations, as Isaiah 10:1 reports. So they permitted the Ammonite to enter the assembly.

Rabbi Abba bar Kahana said that all of Balaam's curses, which God turned into blessings, reverted to curses (and Balaam's intention was eventually fulfilled), except for Balaam's blessing of Israel's synagogues and schoolhouses, for Deuteronomy 23:6 says, "But the Lord your God turned the curse into a blessing for you, because the Lord your God loved you," using the singular "curse," and not the plural "curses" (so that God turned only the first intended curse permanently into a blessing, that concerning synagogues and school-houses, which are destined never to disappear from Israel). Rabbi Joḥanan taught that God reversed every curse that Balaam intended into a blessing. Thus, Balaam wished to curse the Israelites so that they would have no synagogues or schoolhouses, for Numbers 24:5, "How goodly are your tents, O Jacob," refers to synagogues and schoolhouses. Balaam wished that the Shechinah should not rest upon the Israelites, for in Numbers 24:5, "and your tabernacles, O Israel," the Tabernacle symbolizes the Divine Presence. Balaam wished that the Israelites' kingdom should not endure, for Numbers 24:6, "As the valleys are they spread forth," symbolizes the passing of time. Balaam wished that the Israelites might have no olive trees and vineyards, for in Numbers 24:6, he said, "as gardens by the river's side." Balaam wished that the Israelites' smell might not be fragrant, for in Numbers 24:6, he said, "as the trees of aloes that the Lord has planted." Balaam wished that the Israelites' kings might not be tall, for in Numbers 24:6, he said, "and as cedar trees beside the waters." Balaam wished that the Israelites might not have a king who was the son of a king (and thus that they would have unrest and civil war), for in Numbers 24:6, he said, "He shall pour the water out of his buckets," signifying that one king would descend from another. Balaam wished that the Israelites' kingdom might not rule over other nations, for in Numbers 24:6, he said, "and his seed shall be in many waters." Balaam wished that the Israelites' kingdom might not be strong, for in Numbers 24:6, he said, "and his king shall be higher than Agag. Balaam wished that the Israelites' kingdom might not be awe-inspiring, for in Numbers 24:6, he said, "and his kingdom shall be exalted.

Rabbi Jose noted that the law of Deuteronomy 23:8 rewarded the Egyptians for their hospitality, notwithstanding that Genesis 47:6 indicated that the Egyptians befriended the Israelites only for their own benefit. Rabbi Jose concluded that if Providence thus rewarded one with mixed motives, Providence will reward even more one who selflessly shows hospitality to a scholar.

Rabbi Samuel ben Nahman compared the laws of camp hygiene in Deuteronomy 23:10–15 to the case of a High Priest who was walking on the road and met a layman who wanted to walk with him. The High Priest answered the layman that he was a priest and needed to go along a ritually clean path, and that it would thus not be proper for him to walk among graves. The High Priest said that if the layman would come with the priest, it was well and good, but if not, the priest would eventually have to leave the layman and go his own way. So Moses told the Israelites, in the words of Deuteronomy 23:15, "The Lord your God walks in the midst of your camp, to deliver you."

The Mishnah taught that if the time for the recitation of the Shema arrived and a man is impure due to a seminal emission (as discussed in Deuteronomy 23:11), he may contemplate the Shema in his mind, but neither recite the blessings preceding the Shema nor the blessings following it. Over food, after partaking, one is obligated to recite a blessing; he recites it afterward but not beforehand. In each of these instances, Rabbi Judah taught that he recites the blessings before and after.

Rabbi Eleazar ben Perata taught that manna counteracted the ill effects of foreign foods on the Israelites. But the Gemara taught that after the Israelites complained about the manna in Numbers 21:5, God burdened them with a walk of three parasangs to get outside their camp to answer the call of nature. And it was then that the command of Deuteronomy 23:14, "And you shall have a paddle among your weapons," began to apply to the Israelites.

The Mishnah taught that a red cow born by a caesarean section, the hire of a harlot, or the price of a dog was invalid for Numbers 19. Rabbi Eliezer ruled it valid, as Deuteronomy 23:19 states, "You shall not bring the hire of a harlot or the price of a dog into the house of the Lord your God," and the red cow was not brought into the house.

In part by reference to Deuteronomy 23:19, the Gemara interpreted the words in Leviticus 6:2, "This is the law of the burnt offering: It is that which goes up on its firewood upon the altar all night into the morning." From the passage, "which goes up on its firewood upon the altar all night," the Rabbis deduced that once a thing had been placed upon the altar, it could not be taken down all night. Rabbi Judah taught that the words "This . . . goes up on . . . the altar all night" exclude three things. According to Rabbi Judah, they exclude (1) an animal slaughtered at night, (2) an animal whose blood was spilled, and (3) an animal whose blood was carried out beyond the curtains. Rabbi Judah taught that if any of these things had been placed on the altar, it was brought down. Rabbi Simeon noted that Leviticus 6:2 says "burnt offering." From this, Rabbi Simeon taught that one can only know that a fit burnt offering remained on the altar. But Rabbi Simeon taught that the phrase "the law of the burnt offering" intimates a single law for all burnt offerings: if they were placed on the altar, they were not removed. Rabbi Simeon taught that this law applied to animals that were slaughtered at night, or whose blood was spilt, or whose blood passed out of the curtains, or whose flesh spent the night away from the altar, or whose flesh went out, or were unclean, or were slaughtered with the intention of burning its flesh after time or out of bounds, or whose blood was received and sprinkled by unfit priests, or whose blood was applied below the scarlet line when it should have been applied above, or whose blood was applied above when it should have been applied below, or whose blood was applied outside when it should have been applied within, or whose blood was applied within when it should have been applied outside, or a Passover-offering or a sin-offering that one slaughtered for a different purpose. Rabbi Simeon suggested that one might think that law would also include an animal used for bestiality, set aside for an idolatrous sacrifice or worshipped, a harlot's hire or the price of a dog (as referred to in Deuteronomy 23:19), or a mixed breed, or a trefah (a torn or otherwise disqualified animal), or an animal calved through the cesarean section. But Rabbi Simeon taught that the word "This" serves to exclude these. Rabbi Simeon explained that he included the former in the general rule because their disqualification arose in the sanctuary, whereas he excluded the latter because theirs did not.

The tractates Nedarim and Shevuot in the Mishnah, Tosefta, Jerusalem Talmud, and Babylonian Talmud interpreted the laws of vows and oaths in Exodus 20:7; Leviticus 5:1–10 and 19:12; Numbers 30:2–17; and Deuteronomy 23:22–24.

The Rabbis taught that Providence examines one's record of deeds on three occasions: (1) if one goes on a journey alone, (2) if one sits in an unstable house, and (3) if one vows and does not fulfill one's vow. The midrash taught that we know about the problem of vowing and not paying from Deuteronomy 23:22, "When you vow a vow to the Lord your God, you shalt not be slack to pay it"; and from Proverbs 20:25, "It is a snare to a man rashly to say, 'Holy,' and after vows to make inquiry." If one delays paying one's vow, Providence examines one's record, and the angels assume a prosecutorial stance and scrutinize one's sins. The midrash illustrated this by noting that when Jacob left Canaan for Aram-Naharaim, Genesis 28:20 reports, "Jacob made a vow." Then he became wealthy, returned, and did not pay his vow. So God brought Esau against him, bent on killing Jacob, and Esau took a huge gift from him of the 200 goats and other gifts reported in Genesis 32:15, yet Jacob did not fulfill his vow. So God brought the angel against him, and the angel wrestled with Jacob but did not kill him, as Genesis 32:25 reports: "Jacob was left alone. And a man wrestled with him until the break of dawn." The midrash taught that it was Samael, Esau's guardian angel, who wanted to kill him, as Genesis 32:26 reports, "He saw that he could not prevail against him." But Jacob left disabled. And when Jacob still did not pay his vow, the trouble with Dinah came upon him, as reported in Genesis 34. When Jacob still had not paid his vow, as Genesis 35:19 reports: "Rachel died and was buried." Then God asked how long Jacob would take punishment and not pay attention to the sin for which he suffered. So God told Jacob to go to Bethel, make an altar there, at the very place where Jacob vowed to God.

Tractate Bava Metzia in the Mishnah, Tosefta, Jerusalem Talmud, and Babylonian Talmud interpreted the laws of Deuteronomy 23:25–26 regarding eating the fruit of another's vineyard or field. The Mishnah taught that a worker could eat cucumbers or dates even to a denar's worth. Rabbi Elazar ben Hisma said that a worker could not eat more than the value of the worker's wages. The Sages allowed a worker to do so, but advised that they teach the worker not to be so gluttonous as to close the door on the worker's own future employment. The Tosefta taught that workers were allowed to eat bread with brine (before working) so that they would get thirsty and eat a lot of grapes. But the employer was also allowed to give the workers wine to drink so they would not eat too many grapes. And the Tosefta taught that workers who guarded four or five cucumber patches should not fill their bellies from only one of the patches, but should eat a bit from each patch in proportion. The Jerusalem Talmud asked whether Deuteronomy 23:25 applied to anybody who wandered into a field and began to eat. Thus, Deuteronomy 23:25 goes on to say, "But you shall not wave a sickle in your neighbor's standing grain," and this encompasses only one who had permission to wave a sickle in the neighbor's standing grain, and that must mean a worker. Issi ben Aqabiah, however, said that Scripture speaks of anybody who enters the field, not just workers. The Jerusalem Talmud explained that Deuteronomy 23:25 says, "But you shall not wave a sickle in your neighbor's standing grain," to teach that one has the right to eat from the crop only during the time that the sickle is being waved, that is, harvest time. In the Babylonian Talmud, however, Rav objected that Issi's view would not let any farmer remain in business. Interpreting the words "until you have enough" in Deuteronomy 23:25, the Gemara in the Babylonian Talmud taught that a worker was not to eat excessively. Interpreting the words "but you shall not put any in your vessel," the Gemara taught that the worker was not to put any in a vessel to take home.

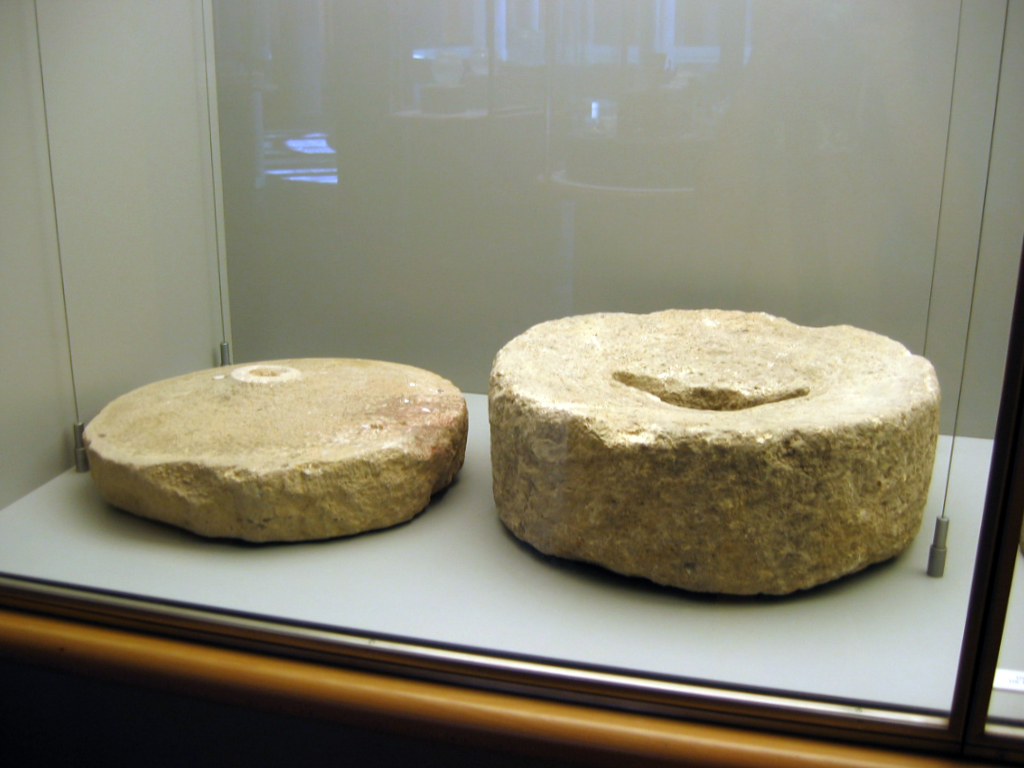
Ancient Roman hand mills (2007 photo by Valdavia of exhibit at the Archaeological Museum of Palencia)

=== Deuteronomy chapter 24 ===
Tractate Gittin in the Mishnah, Tosefta, Jerusalem Talmud, and Babylonian Talmud interpreted the laws of divorce in Deuteronomy 24:1.

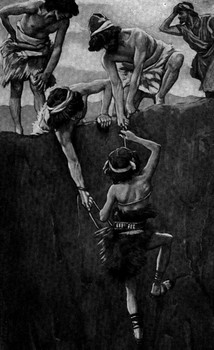
Joseph's Brothers Raise Him from the Pit in Order To Sell Him (watercolor circa 1896–1902 by James Tissot)

The Mishnah interpreted the prohibition of Deuteronomy 24:6, "No man shall take the mill or the upper millstone to pledge," to teach that a creditor who took a mill as security for a loan transgressed a negative commandment and was guilty on account of two forbidden utensils. The Mishnah interpreted Deuteronomy 24:6 to prohibit a creditor from taking as security not only millstones but also everything used in the preparation of food for human consumption. For the continuation of Deuteronomy 24:6 says of the creditor, "for he takes a man's life to pledge" (and the debtor needs such utensils to prepare the food necessary to sustain life).

A midrash interpreted the words of Genesis 37:24, "there was no water in it," to teach that there was no recognition of Torah in the pit into which Joseph's brothers cast him, as Torah is likened to water, as Isaiah 55:1 says, "everyone that thirsts, come for water." For the Torah (in Deuteronomy 24:7) says, "If a man be found stealing any of his brethren of the children of Israel . . . and sell him, then that thief shall die," and yet Joseph's brothers sold their brother.

The Gemara read the emphatic words of Deuteronomy 24:12–13, "you shall surely restore . . . the pledge," repeating the verb in the Hebrew, to teach that Deuteronomy 24:12–13 required a lender to restore the pledge whether or not the lender took the pledge with the court's permission. And the Gemara taught that the Torah provided similar injunctions in Deuteronomy 24:12–13 and Exodus 22:25, requiring that a lender return a garment worn during the day before sunrise and a garment worn during the night before sunset.

Rabbi Eliezer the Great taught that the Torah warns against wronging a stranger in 36, or others say 46, places (including Deuteronomy 24:14–15 and 17–22). The Gemara went on to cite Rabbi Nathan's interpretation of Exodus 22:20, "You shall neither wrong a stranger, nor oppress him; for you were strangers in the land of Egypt," to teach that one must not taunt one's neighbor about a flaw that one has oneself. The Gemara taught that thus a proverb says: If there is a case of hanging in a person's family history, do not say to the person, "Hang up this fish for me."

The Mishnah interpreted Leviticus 19:13 and Deuteronomy 24:14–15 to teach that a worker engaged for the day could collect the worker's wages for the entire night. If engaged at night, the worker could collect wages the following day. If engaged by the hour, the worker could collect the wages all that day and night. If engaged by the week, month, year, or 7-year period, and the worker's time expired during the day, the worker could collect wages for that day. If the worker's time expired during the night, the worker could collect wages for the rest of that night and the following day.

The Mishnah taught that the hire of persons, animals, or utensils was all subject to the law of Deuteronomy 24:15 that "in the same day you shall give him his hire" and the law of Leviticus 19:13 that "the wages of a hired servant shall not abide with you all night until the morning." The employer became liable only when the worker or vendor demanded payment from the employer. Otherwise, the employer did not infringe the law. If the employer gave the worker or vendor a draft on a shopkeeper or a money changer, the employer complied with the law. A worker who claimed the wages within the set time could collect payment if the worker merely swore that the employer had not yet paid. But if the set time had passed, the worker's oath was insufficient to collect payment. Yet if the worker had witnesses that the worker had demanded payment (within the set time), the worker could still swear and receive payment.

The Mishnah taught that the employer of a resident alien was subject to the law of Deuteronomy 24:15 that "in the same day you shall give him his hire" (as Deuteronomy 24:14 refers to the stranger), but not to the law of Leviticus 19:13 that "the wages of a hired servant shall not abide with you all night until the morning."

The Gemara reconciled apparently discordant verses touching on vicarious responsibility. The Gemara noted that Deuteronomy 24:16 states: "The fathers shall not be put to death for the children, neither shall the children be put to death for the fathers; every man shall be put to death for his own sin," but Exodus 20:5 says: "visiting the iniquity of the fathers upon the children." The Gemara cited a baraita that interpreted the words "the iniquities of their fathers shall they pine away with them" in Leviticus 26:39 to teach that God punishes children only when they follow their parents' sins. The Gemara then questioned whether the words "they shall stumble one upon another" in Leviticus 26:37 do not teach that one will stumble through the sin of the other, that all are held responsible for one another. The Gemara answered that the vicarious responsibility of which Leviticus 26:37 speaks is limited to those who have the power to restrain their fellow from evil but do not do so.

Reading the words of Deuteronomy 24:17, "You shall not take a widow's raiment to pledge," the Mishnah taught that a person may not take a pledge from a widow whether she is rich or poor. The Gemara explained that Rabbi Judah (reading the text literally) expounded the view that no pledge may be taken from her whether she is rich or poor. Rabbi Simeon, however, (addressing the purpose of the text) taught that a wealthy widow was subject to distraint, but not a poor one, for the creditor was bound (by Deuteronomy 24:12–13) to return the pledge to her, and would bring her into disrepute among her neighbors (by her frequent visits to the creditor).

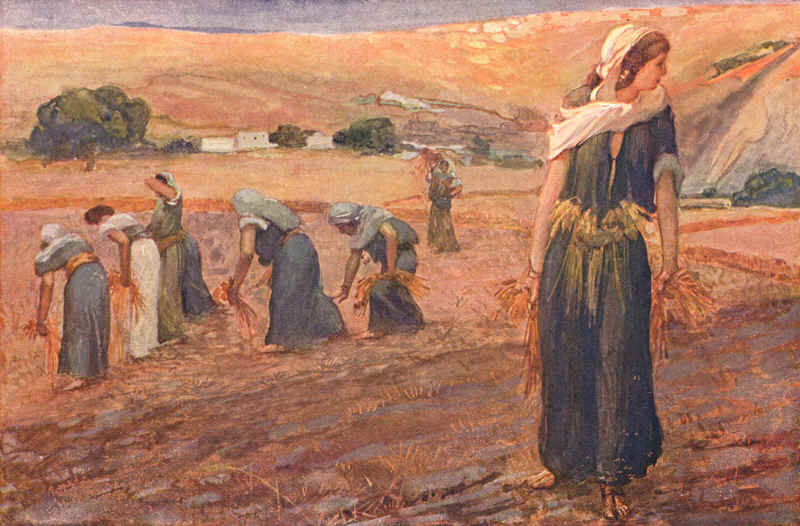
Gleaners (watercolor circa 1900 by James Tissot)

Tractate Peah in the Mishnah, Tosefta, and Jerusalem Talmud interpreted the laws of the harvest of the corner of the field and gleanings to be given to the poor in Leviticus 19:9–10 and 23:22, and Deuteronomy 24:19–22.

The Mishnah and the Tosefta taught that the Torah sets no upper limit for the donation of the corners of one's field to the poor. But the Mishnah also taught that one should not make the amount left to people with low incomes less than one-sixtieth of the entire crop. And even though no definite amount is given, the amount given should accord with the size of the field, the number of poor people, and the extent of the yield.

Rabbi Eliezer taught that one who cultivates land in which one can plant a quarter kav of seed is obligated to give a corner to the poor. Rabbi Joshua said land that yields two seah of grain. Rabbi Tarfon said land of at least six handbreadths by six handbreadths. Rabbi Judah ben Betera said land that requires two strokes of a sickle to harvest, and the law is as he spoke. Rabbi Akiva said that one who cultivates land of any size is obligated to give a corner to the poor and the firstfruits.

The Mishnah taught that people experiencing poverty could enter a field to collect three times a day—in the morning, at midday, and in the afternoon. Rabban Gamliel taught that they said this only so that landowners should not reduce the number of times that people with low incomes could enter. Rabbi Akiva taught that they said this only so that landowners should not increase the number of times that the poor had to enter. The landowners of Beit Namer used to harvest along a rope and allowed the poor to collect a corner from every row.

The Mishnah defined "a defective cluster (עוֹלֶלֶת, olelet)" within the meaning of Leviticus 19:10 and Deuteronomy 24:21 to mean any cluster that had neither a shoulder nor a dangling portion (but rather was entirely attached to the main stem). If the cluster had a shoulder or a dangling portion, it belonged to the property owner, but if there was a doubt, it belonged to people with low incomes. A cluster that was attached to the joint between branches or the stem and the trunk, if it was plucked with the grape cluster, it belonged to the property owner; if not, it belonged to people experiencing poverty. Rabbi Judah said that a single-grape cluster was a cluster, but the Sages said that it was a defective cluster (and thus belonged to the poor).

The Mishnah taught that if a wife foreswore all benefit from other people, her husband could not annul his wife's vow, but she could still benefit from the gleanings, forgotten sheaves, and the corner of the field that Leviticus 19:9–10 and 23:22, and Deuteronomy 24:19–21 commanded farmers to leave for the poor.

Noting that the discussion of gifts to the poor in Leviticus 23:22 appears between discussions of the festivals—Passover and Shavuot on one side, and Rosh Hashanah and Yom Kippur on the other—Rabbi Avardimos ben Rabbi Yossi said that this teaches that people who give immature clusters of grapes (as in Leviticus 19:10 and Deuteronomy 24:21), the forgotten sheaf (as in Deuteronomy 24:19), the corner of the field (as in Leviticus 19:9 and 23:22), and the poor tithe (as in Deuteronomy 14:28 and 26:12) is accounted as if the Temple existed and they offered up their sacrifices in it. And for those who do not give to people experiencing poverty, it is accounted to them as if the Temple existed and they did not offer up their sacrifices in it.

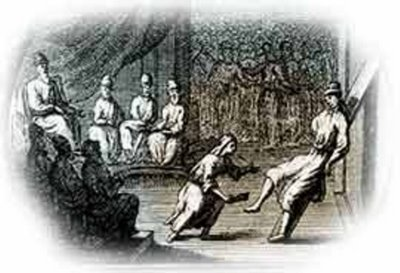
A chalitzah ceremony (engraving from an edition of Mishnah Yevamot published in Amsterdam circa 1700)

=== Deuteronomy chapter 25 ===
Tractate Yevamot in the Mishnah, Tosefta, Jerusalem Talmud, and Babylonian Talmud interpreted the laws of levirate marriage (יִבּוּם, yibbum) in Deuteronomy 25:5–10.

Interpreting the laws of Levirite marriage (יִבּוּם, yibbum) under Deuteronomy 25:5–6, the Gemara read Exodus 21:4 to address a Hebrew slave who married the Master's Canaanite slave, and deduced from Exodus 21:4 that the children of such a marriage were also considered Canaanite slaves and thus that their lineage flowed from their mother, not their father. The Gemara used this analysis of Exodus 21:4 to explain why Mishnah Yevamot 2:5 taught that the son of a Canaanite slave mother does not impose the obligation of Levirate marriage (יִבּוּם, yibbum) under Deuteronomy 25:5–6.

Chapter 3 of the tractate Makkot in the Mishnah and the Babylonian Talmud interpreted the laws of punishment by lashes in Deuteronomy 25:1–3.

The Gemara interpreted Deuteronomy 25:13–15 to teach that both one's wealth and one's necessities depend on one's honesty.

Reading Deuteronomy 25:15, Rabbi Levi taught that blessed actions bless those responsible for them, and cursed actions curse those responsible for them. The midrash interpreted the words of Deuteronomy 25:15, "A perfect and just weight you shall have," to mean that if one acts justly, one will have something to take and something to give, something to buy and something to sell. Conversely, the midrash reads Deuteronomy 25:13–14 to teach, "You shall not have (possessions if there are) in your bag diverse weights, a great and a small. You shall not have (possessions if there are) in your house diverse measures, a great and a small." Thus, if one does employ deceitful measures, one will not have anything to take or give, to buy or sell. The midrash taught that God tells businesspeople that they "may not make" one measure great and another small, but if they do, they "will not make" a profit. The midrash likened this commandment to that of Exodus 20:20, "You shall not make with Me gods of silver, or gods of gold, you shall not make," for if a person did make gods of silver and gold, then that person would not be able to afford to have even gods of wood or stone.

scales

Rabbi Levi taught that the punishment for false weights or measures (discussed at Deuteronomy 25:13–16) was more severe than that for having intimate relations with forbidden relatives (discussed at Leviticus 18:6–20). For in discussing the case of forbidden relatives, Leviticus 18:27 uses the Hebrew word אֵל, eil, for the word "these," whereas in the case of false weights or measures, Deuteronomy 25:16 uses the Hebrew word אֵלֶּה, eileh, for the word "these" (and the additional ה, eh at the end of the word implies additional punishment.) The Gemara taught that one can derive that אֵל, eil, implies rigorous punishment from Ezekiel 17:13, which says, "And the mighty (אֵילֵי, eilei) of the land he took away." The Gemara explained that the punishments for giving false measures are greater than those for having relations with forbidden relatives because for forbidden relatives, repentance is possible (as long as there have not been children), but with false measure, repentance is impossible (as one cannot remedy the sin of robbery by mere repentance; the return of the things robbed must precede it, and in the case of false measures, it is practically impossible to find out all the members of the public who have been defrauded).

Rabbi Ḥiyya taught that the words of Leviticus 19:35, "You shall do no unrighteousness in judgment," apply to legal judgment. But a midrash noted that Leviticus 19:15 already mentioned judgment in law and questioned why Leviticus 19:35 would state the same proposition again, and why it uses the words "in judgment, in measures." The midrash deduced that Leviticus 19:35 teaches that a person who measures is called a judge, and one who falsifies measurements is called by the five names "unrighteous," "hated," "repulsive," "accursed," and an "abomination," and is the cause of these five evils. Rabbi Banya said in the name of Rav Huna that the government comes and attacks that generation whose measures are false. The midrash found support for this from Proverbs 11:1, "A false balance is an abomination to the Lord," which is followed by Proverbs 11:2, "When presumption comes, then comes shame." Reading Micah 6:11: "Shall I be pure with wicked balances?" Rabbi Berekiah said in the name of Rabbi Abba that it is impossible for a generation whose measures are false to be meritorious, for Micah 6:11 continues, "And with a bag of deceitful weights" (showing that their holdings would be merely illusory). Rabbi Levi taught that Moses also hinted to Israel that a generation with false measures would be attacked. Deuteronomy 25:13–14 warns, "You shall not have in your bag diverse weights . . . you shall not have in your house diverse measures." But if one does, one will be attacked, as Deuteronomy 25:16, reports, "For all who do such things, even all who do unrighteously, are an abomination to the Lord your God," and then immediately following, Deuteronomy 25:17 says, "Remember what Amalek did to you (attacking Israel) by the way as you came forth out of Egypt."

Rabbi Judah said that three commandments were given to the Israelites when they entered the land: (1) the commandment of Deuteronomy 17:14–15 to appoint a king, (2) the commandment of Deuteronomy 25:19 to blot out Amalek, and (3) the commandment of Deuteronomy 12:10–11 to build the Temple in Jerusalem. Rabbi Nehorai, on the other hand, said that Deuteronomy 17:14–15 did not command the Israelites to choose a king, but was spoken only in anticipation of the Israelites' future complaints, as Deuteronomy 17:14 says, "And (you) shall say, 'I will set a king over me.'"

== In medieval Jewish interpretation ==
The parashah is discussed in these medieval Jewish sources:

=== Deuteronomy chapter 22 ===
Abraham ibn Ezra wrote that the commandment of Deuteronomy 22:1–3 to return lost property appears in the Torah portion that begins in Deuteronomy 21:10, "When you go forth to battle" ( כִּי-תֵצֵא לַמִּלְחָמָה, ki tetze la-milchamah), to teach that the duty to return lost property applies even in a time of war.

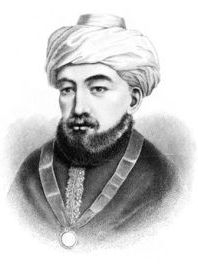
Moses Maimonides

Reading Deuteronomy 22:1–3, Maimonides taught that if a person sees a lost object and the person's father says not to return it, the person should return it instead of obeying the person's father. For by obeying the father and fulfilling the positive commandment "Honor your father" in Exodus 20:12, the person would violate the positive commandment "And you shall certainly return it" as well as the negative commandment "You may not ignore it." And reading Deuteronomy 22:3, "All objects lost by your colleague," Maimonides taught that if a person sees flood waters coming that will ruin a building or a field belonging to a colleague, the person is obligated to put up a barrier before the waters to check them. Maimonides said that the mention of "All" in Deuteronomy 22:3 includes the devastation of property.

Maimonides wrote that the object of the law of restoring lost property to its owner in Deuteronomy 22:1–3 is plain. In the first instance, it is a good feature in a person's character. Secondly, its benefit is mutual: For if a person does not return the lost property of another, nobody will restore to the person what the person may lose, just as those who do not honor their parents cannot expect to be honored by their children.

The Sefer ha-Chinuch also taught that the root of Deuteronomy 22:1–3 is plain—as there is in it a benefit to all, and to the ordering of the state, as all people are forgetful, and their animals flee here and there. The Sefer ha-Chinuch argued that with this commandment in place, beasts and vessels will be safe anywhere in the holy land as if they were under the hand of their owners.

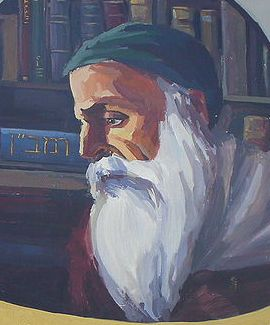
Nachmanides

Nachmanides noted that Deuteronomy 22:2 says, "your brother's," while the parallel commandment in Exodus 23:4 states, "your enemy's," and Exodus 23:5 says, "of him who hates you." Nachmanides taught that Scripture thus means to say, "Do this for him (in assisting him), and remember the brotherhood between you and forget the hatred."

Similarly, Bahya ben Asher noted the parallel between Deuteronomy 22:1–3 and Exodus 23:5. Bahya concluded that Deuteronomy 22:1–3 thus promises that if you assist your enemy with his falling donkey, he will eventually appreciate you and become "your brother." When you assist him, he will forget the "hatred" between you and only remember the bond of love that unites brothers. Bahya taught that there is more to the commandment to restore lost property than merely the act of restoring it. If one can perform a useful service for one's fellow and to thereby protect one's fellow against loss, this is part of the commandment. Bahya also found in Deuteronomy 22:1–3 encouragement regarding the resurrection, reading that God will practice this commandment personally by restoring the souls of the departed bodies to their original owners after the arrival of the Messiah. Noting that Deuteronomy 22:3 continues, "You must not hide yourself," Bahya found the moral lesson: Do not hide yourself from God, so that when the time comes, God will not hide from you.

Maimonides read Deuteronomy 22:4, "You shall not see your brother's ass or his ox fallen down by the way, and hide yourself from them; you shall surely help him to lift them up again," together with Exodus 23:5, "If you see the ass of him that hates you lying under its burden, you shall forbear to pass by him; you shall surely release it with him." Maimonides taught that when a person encounters a colleague on a journey and the colleague's animal has fallen under its load, Exodus 23:5 commands the person to unload the burden from it, whether or not the animal was carrying an appropriate burden for it. Maimonides interpreted Deuteronomy 22:4 to command that one should not unload the animal and depart, leaving the wayfarer in panic, but one should lift up the animal together with its owner, and reload the animal's burden on it. Maimonides taught that the general principle is that if the animal were one's own and one would unload and reload it, one is obligated to unload and reload it for a colleague. If one is pious and goes beyond the measure of the law, even if one is a great prince, and sees an animal belonging to a colleague fallen under a load of straw, reeds or the like, one should unload and load it with its owner. Maimonides interpreted the intensified form of the verbs in Exodus 23:5 and Deuteronomy 22:4 to indicate that if one unloaded and reloaded the animal, and it fell again, one is obligated to unload and reload it another time, indeed even 100 times. Thus, one must accompany the animal for a distance thereafter, unless the owner of the burden says that it is not necessary. Maimonides read Exodus 23:5 to obligate one when one sees the fallen animal in a way that can be described as an encounter, for Exodus 23:5 says, "When you see your colleague's donkey," and Exodus 23:4 says, "When you encounter . . . ." Maimonides taught that if one finds an animal belonging to a colleague fallen under its load, it is a commandment to unload and reload it even if its owner is not present, for the words "You shall certainly help" and "You shall certainly lift up" imply that one must fulfill these commandments in all situations. Maimonides said that Exodus 23:5 says, "together with him" (that is, the animal's owner) to teach that if the owner of the animal was there and goes off to the side and relies on the passerby to unload it alone because the passerby is subject to a commandment, then the passerby is not obligated. If the owner of the animal is old or ailing, however, the passerby is obligated to load and unload the animal alone.

Maimonides taught that Deuteronomy 22:6–7 enjoins that one should let the mother fly away when one takes the young to prevent pain to the mother bird. Maimonides argued that there is no difference between the pain of humans and animals. Maimonides concluded that if the Torah provides that we should not cause such grief to animals, how much more careful should we be not to cause grief to other people.

Rabbi David Kimchi stated that a parapet (Deuteronomy 22:8) needed to be "ten hands high, or more, that a person might not fall from it".

Reading Deuteronomy 22:29, Maimonides taught that either a woman who had been violated or her father could refuse her marriage with the offending man.

=== Deuteronomy chapter 23 ===
Maimonides used Deuteronomy 23:8 to interpret how far to extend the principle of charity. Maimonides taught that the Law correctly says in Deuteronomy 15:11, "You shall open your hand wide to your brother, to your poor." Maimonides continued that the Law taught how far we have to extend this principle of treating kindly every one with whom we have some relationship—even if the other person offended or wronged us, even if the other person is very bad, we still must have some consideration for the other person. Thus Deuteronomy 23:8 says: "You shall not abhor an Edomite, for he is your brother." And if we find a person in trouble, whose assistance we once enjoyed, or of whom we have received some benefit, even if that person has subsequently wronged us, we must bear in mind that person's previous good conduct. Thus Deuteronomy 23:8 says: "You shall not abhor an Egyptian, because you were a stranger in his land," although the Egyptians subsequently oppressed the Israelites very much.

=== Deuteronomy chapter 25 ===
Reading the words of Deuteronomy 24:17, "You shall not take a widow's raiment to pledge," Maimonides taught that collateral may not be taken from a widow, whether she is rich or poor, whether it is taken at the time the loan is given or after the time the loan is given, and even when a court would supervise the matter. Maimonides continued that if a creditor takes such collateral, it must be returned, even against the creditor's will. If the widow admits the debt, she must pay, but if she denies its existence, she must take an oath. If the security the creditor took was lost or consumed by fire before the creditor returned it, the creditor was punished by lashes.

== In modern interpretation ==
The parashah is discussed in these modern sources:

=== Deuteronomy chapter 21 ===
Tamara Cohn Eskenazi cited Deuteronomy 21:10–14, which describes a process by which a woman captured in war could become the wife of an Israelite man, as an example of intermarriage in the Torah, for although the text does not specify the woman's ethnic identity, the context implies that she was non-Israelite.

David Wolpe said that although the law of the beautiful captive is barbaric by the ethical standards of the 21st century, it was ahead of its time by the ethical standards of antiquity. The law, according to Wolpe, indicates that the Torah distrusts people to control their sexual urges towards people over whom they hold power.

=== Deuteronomy chapter 22 ===
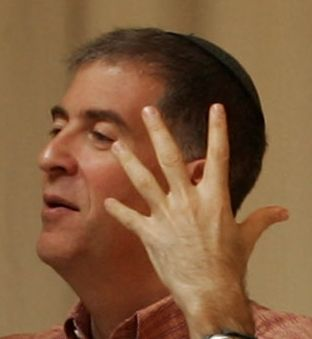
Hartman

Donniel Hartman argued that Deuteronomy 22:1–3 contains one of Judaism's central answers to the question of what is just and right, what he called "the religious ethic of nonindifference."

Writing for the Committee on Jewish Law and Standards of Conservative Judaism, Elliot N. Dorff and Aaron L. Mackler relied on Deuteronomy 22:2, among other verses, to find a duty to help see that our society provides health care to those who need it. Dorff and Mackler noted that the Rabbis found the authorization and requirement to heal in several verses, including Exodus 21:19–20, according to which an assailant must ensure that his victim is "thoroughly healed," and Deuteronomy 22:2, "And you shall restore the lost property to him." Dorff and Mackler reported that on the basis of an extra letter in the Hebrew text of Deuteronomy 22:2, the Talmud declared that Deuteronomy 22:2 includes the obligation to restore another person's body as well as his or her property, and hence there is an obligation to come to the aid of someone in a life-threatening situation.

Jay Sklar suggested that Deuteronomy 22:6–7—which prohibits taking a mother bird along with her young—to fit with Exodus 23:5, 10–12; Leviticus 22:27; and Proverbs 12:10 as showing concern for animal well-being.

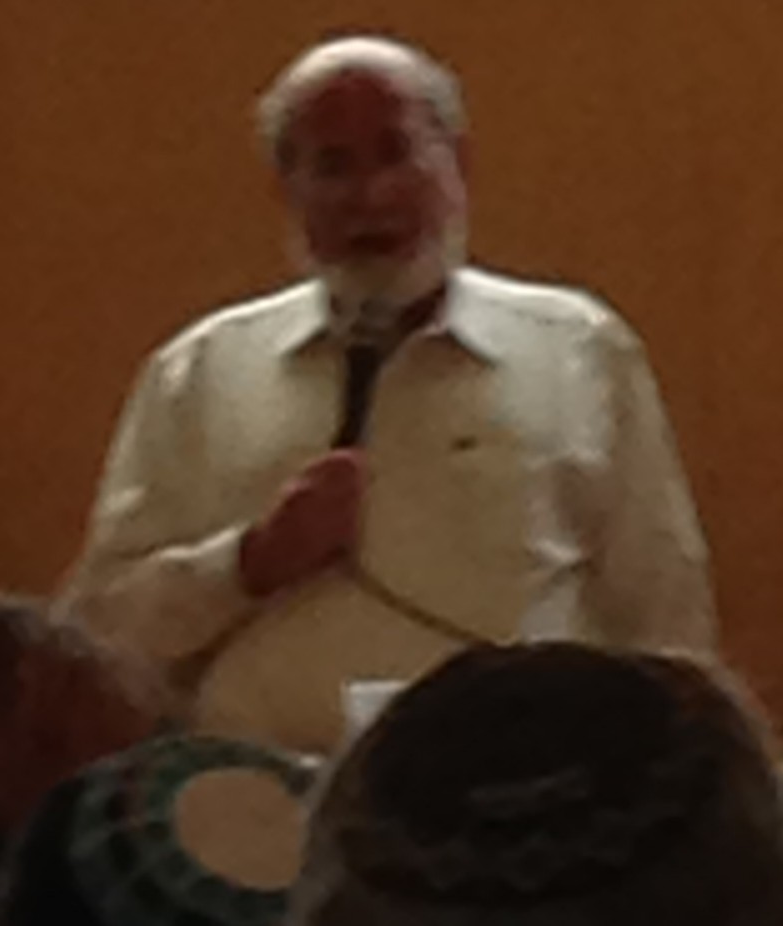
Telushkin

Joseph Telushkin noted that the Torah three times promises long life for obeying commandments—Exodus 20:11 and Deuteronomy 22:6–7 and 25:15—and all three involve issues of ethics and kindness.

William Dever noted that most of the 100 linen and wool fragments, likely textiles used for cultic purposes, that archeologists found at Kuntillet Ajrud in the Sinai Desert (where the climate may better preserve organic materials) adhered to the regulations in Leviticus 19:19 and Deuteronomy 22:11.

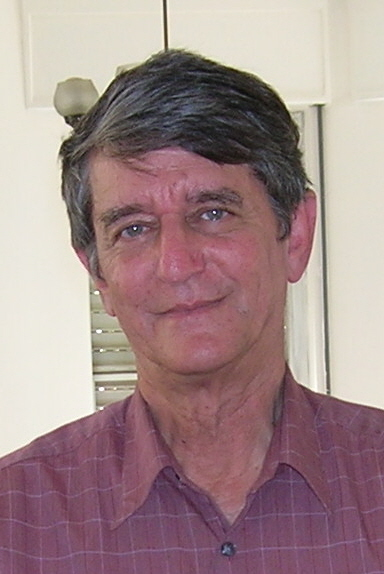
Kugel

In April 2014, the Committee on Jewish Law and Standards of Conservative Judaism ruled that women are now equally responsible for observing commandments as men have been, and that women are thus responsible for the mitzvah of wearing tzitzit, as commanded in Deuteronomy 22:12.

=== Deuteronomy chapter 25 ===
James Kugel noted that Deuteronomy shares certain favorite themes with Wisdom literature, such as the prohibition of using false weights in Deuteronomy 25:13–16 and Proverbs 11:1, 20:10 and 23. As well, in the wisdom perspective, history is the repository of eternal truths, lessons that never grow old, and thus Deuteronomy constantly urges its readers to "remember," as Deuteronomy 25:17 does when it admonishes to "Remember what Amalek did to you." Kugel concluded that the Deuteronomist was closely connected to the world of wisdom literature.

Diagram of the Documentary Hypothesis

== In critical analysis ==
Some scholars who follow the Documentary Hypothesis consider all of the parashah to have been part of the original Deuteronomic Code (sometimes abbreviated Dtn) that the first Deuteronomistic historian (sometimes abbreviated Dtr 1) included in the edition of Deuteronomy that existed during Josiah's time.

== Commandments ==
According to the Sefer ha-Chinuch, there are 27 positive and 47 negative commandments in the parashah.

- To keep the laws of the captive woman
- Not to sell the captive woman into slavery
- Not to retain the captive woman for servitude after having relations with her
- The courts must hang those stoned for blasphemy or idolatry.
- To bury the executed on the day that they die
- Not to delay burial overnight
- To return a lost object to its owner
- Not to turn a blind eye to a lost object
- Not to leave another's beast lying under its burden
- To lift up a load for a Jew
- Women must not wear men's clothing.
- Men must not wear women's clothing.
- Not to take the mother bird from her children
- To release the mother bird if she was taken from the nest
- To build a parapet
- Not to leave a stumbling block about
- Not to plant grains or greens in a vineyard
- Not to eat diverse seeds planted in a vineyard
- Not to do work with two kinds of animals together
- Not to wear cloth of wool and linen
- To marry a wife by means of ketubah and kiddushin
- The slanderer must remain married to his wife.
- The slanderer must not divorce his wife.
- The court must have anyone who merits stoning stoned to death.
- Not to punish anyone compelled to commit a transgression
- The seducer must marry his partner if she chooses.
- The seducer is not allowed to divorce his partner.
- Not to let a eunuch marry into the Jewish people
- Not to let the child of a prohibited union (מַמְזֵר, mamzer) marry into the Jewish people
- Not to let Moabite and Ammonite men marry into the Jewish people
- Not to ever offer peace to Moab or Ammon
- Not to exclude a third generation Edomite convert from marrying into the Jewish people
- To exclude Egyptian converts from marrying into the Jewish people only for the first two generations
- A ritually unclean person should not enter the camp of the Levites.
- To prepare a place of easement in a camp
- To prepare a boring-stick or spade for easement in a camp
- Not to return a slave who fled into Israel from his master abroad
- Not to oppress a slave who fled into Israel from his master abroad
- Not to have relations with women not married by means of ketubah and kiddushin
- Not to bring the wage of a harlot or the exchange price of a dog as a holy offering
- Not to borrow at interest from a Jew
- To lend at interest to a non-Jew if the non-Jew needs a loan, but not to a Jew
- Not to be tardy with vowed and voluntary offerings
- To fulfill whatever goes out from one's mouth
- To allow a hired worker to eat certain foods while under hire
- That a hired hand should not raise a sickle to another's standing grain
- That a hired hand is forbidden to eat from the employer's crops during work
- To issue a divorce by means of a get document
- A man must not remarry his ex-wife after she has married someone else.
- Not to demand from the bridegroom any involvement, communal or military during the first year
- To give him who has taken a wife, built a new home, or planted a vineyard a year to rejoice therewith
- Not to demand as collateral utensils needed for preparing food
- The metzora must not remove his signs of impurity.
- The creditor must not forcibly take collateral.
- Not to delay return of collateral when needed
- To return the collateral to the debtor when needed
- To pay wages on the day that they were earned
- Relatives of the litigants must not testify.
- A judge must not pervert a case involving a convert or orphan.
- Not to demand collateral from a widow
- To leave the forgotten sheaves in the field
- Not to retrieve the forgotten sheaves
- The precept of whiplashes for the wicked
- The court must not exceed the prescribed number of lashes.
- Not to muzzle an ox while plowing
- The widow must not remarry until the ties with her brother-in-law are removed.
- To marry a childless brother's widow (to do yibum)
- To free a widow from yibum (to do חליצה, chalitzah)
- To save someone being pursued by a killer, even by taking the life of the pursuer
- To have no mercy on a pursuer with intent to kill
- Not to possess inaccurate scales and weights even if they are not for use
- To remember what Amalek did to the Jewish people
- To wipe out the descendants of Amalek
- Not to forget Amalek's atrocities and ambush on the Israelites' journey from Egypt in the desert

== In the liturgy ==
The parashah is reflected in these parts of the Jewish liturgy:

Following the Shacharit morning prayer service, some Jews recite the Six Remembrances, among which is Deuteronomy 24:9, "Remember what the Lord your God did to Miriam by the way as you came forth out of Egypt," recalling that God punished Miriam with skin disease (צָּרַעַת, tzara'at).

== Weekly maqam ==
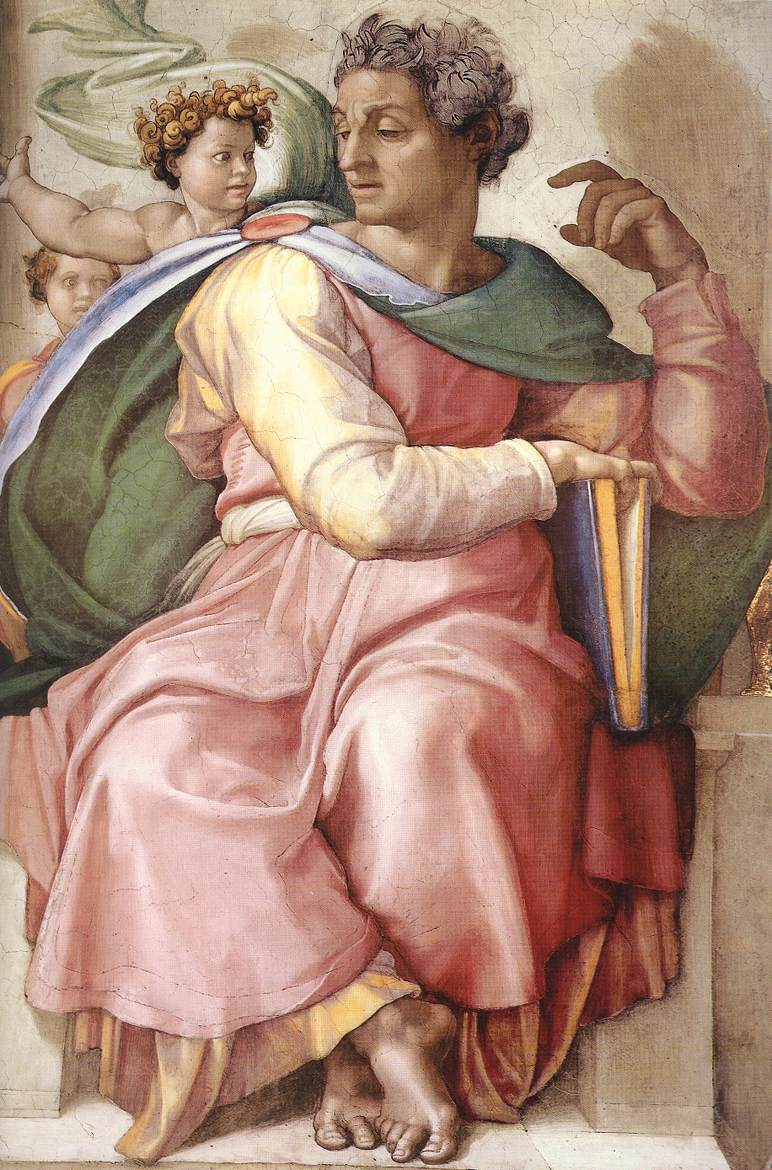
Isaiah (1509 fresco by Michelangelo)

For Parashat Ki Teitzei, the weekly maqam applied by Sephardi Jews is Maqam Saba. Saba, in Hebrew, literally means 'army'. It is appropriate here, because the parashah commences with the discussion of what to do in certain cases of war with the army.

== Haftarah ==
The haftarah for the parashah is Isaiah 54:1–10. The haftarah is the fifth in the cycle of seven haftarot of consolation after Tisha B'Av, leading up to Rosh Hashanah.
