= Nehemiah 5 =

Chapter in the Book of Nehemiah

- ← chapter 4 chapter 6 →
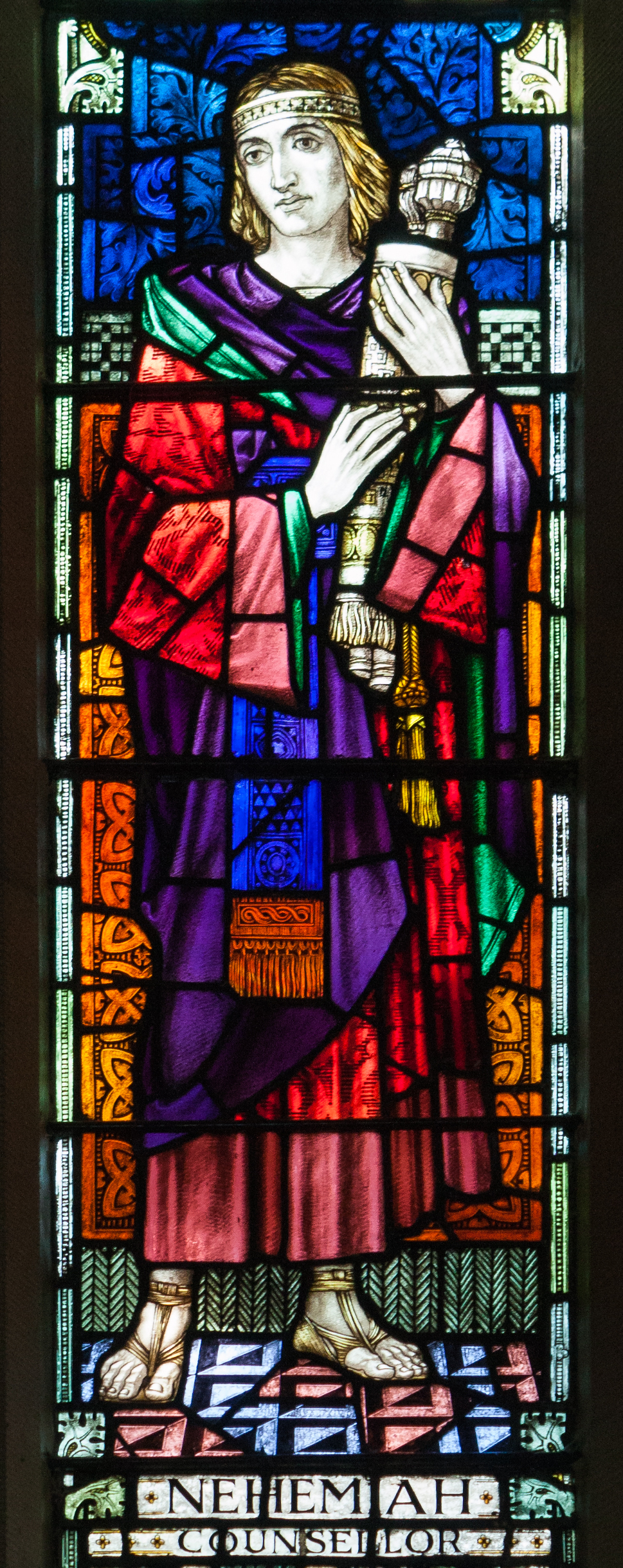
- A stained glass window depicting Nehemiah as "counsellor". Signed by Joshua Clarke & Sons, Dublin. St Patrick's Church, Coleraine, County Londonderry, Ireland
- Book: Book of Nehemiah
- Category: Ketuvim
- Christian Bible part: Old Testament
- Order in the Christian part: 16

Nehemiah 5 is the fifth chapter of the Book of Nehemiah in the Old Testament of the Christian Bible, or the 15th chapter of the book of Ezra-Nehemiah in the Hebrew Bible, which treats the book of Ezra and the book of Nehemiah as one book. Jewish tradition states that Ezra is the author of Ezra-Nehemiah as well as the Book of Chronicles, but modern scholars generally accept that a compiler from the 5th century BCE (the so-called "Chronicler") is the final author of these books. This chapter records the reform of Nehemiah in the case of economic oppression among the Jews, and shows how he led by example.

== Text ==
The original text of this chapter is in Hebrew. This chapter is divided into 19 verses.

=== Textual witnesses ===
Some early manuscripts containing the text of this chapter in Hebrew are of the Masoretic Text, which includes Codex Leningradensis (1008). (Note: Since 1947 the whole book of Ezra-Nehemiah has been missing from the text of the Aleppo Codex.)

There is also a translation into Koine Greek known as the Septuagint, made in the last few centuries BCE. Extant ancient manuscripts of the Septuagint version include Codex Vaticanus (B; $\mathfrak{G}$^{B}; 4th century), Codex Sinaiticus (S; BHK: $\mathfrak{G}$^{S}; 4th century), and Codex Alexandrinus (A; $\mathfrak{G}$^{A}; 5th century).

== Troubles within (5:1–13) ==
For any organization or nation, any internal schisms, inequities, or injustices in any organization or nation will bring ruin far quicker than outside attack, so the well-being (and survival) of a particular group or community depends on its internal health. This section deals with the economic oppression among the Jews (verses 1–5), Nehemiah's judgment on the issue (verses 6–11), and the pledge of the people (verses 12–13). Verse 3 refers to a famine as the cause of hunger and price inflation. Methodist writer Joseph Benson suggests this is the famine announced by the prophet Haggai, who spoke in the second year of King Darius: "through want of rain, which God had withheld as a punishment for the people’s taking more care to build their own houses than his temple". Anglican bishop H. E. Ryle notes a connection with the rebuilding of the walls of Jerusalem recorded in the previous chapter: "a general stoppage of trade must have resulted from the national undertaking. The presence of the enemy in the neighbourhood prevented free agricultural labour."

=== Verse 1 ===
Now there was a great outcry of the people and their wives against their fellow Jews.

The Revised Version's opening word is "then", which Ryle argues "rightly" connects this passage with the rebuilding of the walls. The "outcry of the people", from Hebrew: צעקת העם, tsa-‘ă-qaṯ hā-‘ām, is a cry of oppression against their own people, their Jewish neighbors; in contrast to the cry against Pharaoh, or the cry against enemies (cf. Exodus 14:10; 22:23), also ‘the cry to God for deliverance from injustice and abuse’ (Psalm 107:6, 19–20).

=== Verse 8 ===
And I said to them, "According to our ability, we have redeemed our Jewish brethren who were sold to the nations. Now indeed, will you even sell your brethren? Or should they be sold to us?" Then they were silenced and found nothing to say.

This verse "apparently refers to what had been the merciful custom of [Nehemiah] and his countrymen when they were in exile, but possibly also to his action in Jerusalem since his arrival. The word for ‘redeemed’ here would be literally rendered 'acquired' or 'bought'." In the Septuagint, the redemption of the enslaved Jews was secured εν ἑκούσίω ημών (en hekousiō hemōn), through our freewill offerings. The word ἑκούσιον (hekousion) appears in St Paul's Letter to Philemon, where Paul seeks to ensure that Philemon's generosity is not secured "by compulsion, as it were, but voluntary".

== Leadership by example (5:14–19) ==
As governor of Yehud Medinata, the province of Judah, Nehemiah led by example, where he demonstrates his integrity and his unbending adherence to God's laws and his moral standard. Unlike the previous governors who took bread, wine, and 'forty shekels of silver', Nehemiah declined to take an income from taxes, and even at his own expense provided ‘the necessities expected of a government official’.

=== Verse 14 ===
Moreover from the time that I was appointed to be their governor in the land of Judah (from the twentieth year even until the thirty-second year of King Artaxerxes) twelve years had passed. And my companions and I had not eaten the governor's food allotment.

Nehemiah's appointment took place in Nisan 444 BC (or 445 BC; the 20th year of Artaxerxes I), as recorded in Nehemiah 2:1, and he governed Judah for 12 years. Therefore, the entire first section of the Book of Nehemiah (chapters 1–7) could be written after 432 BC (the 32nd year of Artaxerxes I), the year when Nehemiah returned to the Persian court from Jerusalem (Nehemiah 13:6).

=== Verse 16 ===
Indeed, I also continued the work on this wall, and we did not buy any land. All my servants were gathered there for the work.

Ryle portrays Nehemiah and his friends as "too strenuously occupied (in rebuilding the walls) to interest themselves in the purchase of lands". The Masoretic Text has the plural, we did not buy .... In the Septuagint and Vulgate, the text is singular, et agrum non emi, as it is in the Revised Standard Version, I also held to the work on this wall, and acquired no land.

== See also ==
- Jerusalem
- Slavery
- Related Bible parts: Deuteronomy 20, Deuteronomy 21, Deuteronomy 25, Nehemiah 2, Nehemiah 13

== Sources ==
- Fensham, F. Charles (1982). The Books of Ezra and Nehemiah. New international commentary on the Old Testament (illustrated ed.). Wm. B. Eerdmans Publishing. ISBN 978-0802825278.
- Grabbe, Lester L. (2003). "Nehemiah". In Dunn, James D. G.; Rogerson, John William (eds.). Eerdmans Commentary on the Bible (illustrated ed.). Wm. B. Eerdmans Publishing. pp. 320–328. ISBN 978-0802837110.
- Halley, Henry H. (1965). Halley's Bible Handbook: an abbreviated Bible commentary (24th (revised) ed.). Zondervan Publishing House. ISBN 0-310-25720-4.
- Larson, Knute; Dahlen, Kathy; Anders, Max E. (2005). Anders, Max E. (ed.). Holman Old Testament Commentary - Ezra, Nehemiah, Esther. Vol. 9 (illustrated ed.). B&H Publishing Group. ISBN 978-0805494693.
- Levering, Matthew (2007). Ezra & Nehemiah. Brazos Theological Commentary on the Bible. Brazos Press. ISBN 978-1587431616.
- McConville, J. G. (1985). Ezra, Nehemiah, and Esther. The daily study Bible : Old Testament. Westminster John Knox Press. ISBN 978-0664245832.
- Smith-Christopher, Daniel L. (2007). "15. Ezra-Nehemiah". In Barton, John; Muddiman, John (eds.). The Oxford Bible Commentary (first (paperback) ed.). Oxford University Press. pp. 308–324. ISBN 978-0199277186.
- Würthwein, Ernst (1995). The Text of the Old Testament. Translated by Rhodes, Erroll F. Grand Rapids, MI: Wm. B. Eerdmans. ISBN 0-8028-0788-7.
