= 1 Chronicles 24 =

First Book of Chronicles, chapter 24

- ← chapter 23 chapter 25 →
- The complete Hebrew text of the Books of Chronicles (1 and 2 Chronicles) in the Leningrad Codex (1008 CE).
- Book: Books of Chronicles
- Category: Ketuvim
- Christian Bible part: Old Testament
- Order in the Christian part: 13

1 Chronicles 24 is the twenty-fourth chapter of the Books of Chronicles in the Hebrew Bible or the First Book of Chronicles in the Old Testament of the Christian Bible. The book is compiled from older sources by an unknown person or group, designated by modern scholars as "the Chronicler", and had the final shape established in late fifth or fourth century BCE. This chapter records the organization and departments of priests (verses 1–19) and a list of non-priestly Levites (verses 20–31). The whole chapter belongs to the section focusing on the kingship of David (1 Chronicles 9:35 to 29:30), which from chapter 22 to the end does not have any parallel in 2 Samuel.

== Text ==
This chapter was originally written in the Hebrew language. It is divided into 31 verses.

=== Textual witnesses ===
Some early manuscripts containing the text of this chapter in Hebrew are of the Masoretic Text tradition, which includes the Aleppo Codex (10th century), and Codex Leningradensis (1008).

Extant manuscripts of a Koine Greek translation known as the Septuagint, made in the last few centuries BCE, include Codex Vaticanus (B; $\mathfrak{G}$^{B}; 4th century), Codex Alexandrinus (A; $\mathfrak{G}$^{A}; 5th century) and Codex Marchalianus (Q; $\mathfrak{G}$^{Q}; 6th century). (Note: The extant Codex Sinaiticus only contains 1 Chronicles 9:27–19:17.)

== David organizes the priests (24:1–19) ==
This section details the organization of the priests, the highest branch of the Levites, in a more advanced and systematic manner than anywhere else in the Hebrew Bible and was adhered rigidly until the Roman period (cf. Luke 1:5). Lists of the priestly families also found partially in 1 Chronicles 9:10–13; Nehemiah 10:2–8; Nehemiah 12:1–7; Nehemiah 12:12–21.

=== Verse 1 ===
Now these are the divisions of the sons of Aaron. The sons of Aaron; Nadab, and Abihu, Eleazar, and Ithamar.

Among the four sons of Aaron (Exodus 6:23), Nadab and Abihu died without children (verse 2); and the other two had to supply the "chief men of the house", of which Eleazar had sixteen, and Ithamar eight (verse 4).

=== Verse 3 ===
And David distributed them, both Zadok of the sons of Eleazar, and Ahimelech of the sons of Ithamar, according to their offices in their service.

Of the two priestly families (1 Chronicles 15:11; 18:16–17; 25:1; cf. 2 Samuel 8:16–18), Zadok represented the family of Eleazar, and Ahimelech represented the family of Ithamar, to help David organizing the priests. The Chronicler emphasizes the equal treatment of the two groups in the passage (cf 24:31; 26:13) using a procedure of drawing lots (verse 5), also in 1 Chronicles (24:31; 25:8; 26:13) and elsewhere (for examples. Nehemiah 10:35), to indicate God's hand in the distribution of the personnel.

=== List of the priestly divisions ===
Verse	Division !	English name	Hebrew name	Greek name	Note
7	1st	Jehoiarib	יה֣וֹיָרִ֔יב	Ἰωαρίμ	1 Chronicles 9:10. In Talmud Arakhin 11b Rabbi Yosei ben Halafta states that when Solomon's Temple was burnt on the ninth of Ab [586 BCE] the 'priestly guard' was of Jehoiarib division, and they were singing Psalm 94, but only to the first half of Psalm 94:23 (until "their own wickedness") before 'the enemies came and overwhelmed them'. Mattathias ben Johanan was a descendant of Jehoiarib according to 1 Maccabees 2:1.
7	2nd	Jedaiah	ידַעְיָ֖ה	Ἰεδίᾳ	1 Chronicles 9:10; one fragment of Dead Sea Scrolls (4Q325; "Mishmarot D") mentions: The beginning of the se[cond] month is [on the si]xth [day] of the course of Jedaiah. On the second of the month is the Sabbath of the course of Harim....
8	3rd	Harim	חָרִם֙	Χαρὶβ	Nehemiah 10:5; Nehemiah 12:15, possibly "Rehum" in Nehemiah 12:3; one fragment of Dead Sea Scrolls (4Q325; "Mishmarot D") mentions: The beginning of the se[cond] month is [on the si]xth [day] of the course of Jedaiah. On the second of the month is the Sabbath of the course of Harim....
8	4th	Seorim	שְׂעֹרִ֖ים	Σεωρὶμ	Meaning "barley" or "bearded"; Latin: Barbatus. Listed in the Yemeni inscription with the division number and place of residence.
9	5th	Malchijah	מַלְכִּיָּה֙	Μελχίᾳ	Nehemiah 10:3, Nehemiah 12:42; other mentions: 1 Chronicles 9:12, Nehemiah 11:12; Jeremiah 21:1; Jeremiah 38:1. Listed in the Yemeni inscription with the division number and place of residence. Another Malchijah, an Israelitish layman, was in Nehemiah 3:11 and Ezra 10:25.
9	6th	Mijamin	מִיָּמִ֖ן	Μεϊαμὶν	Nehemiah 10:7; Nehemiah 12:5; "Minjamin" in Nehemiah 12:17 Listed in the Yemeni inscription with the division number and place of residence.
10	7th	Hakkoz	הַקּוֹץ֙	Κὼς	Ezra 2:61; Nehemiah 3:4, 21. Listed in the Yemeni inscription with the division number and place of residence.
10	8th	Abijah	אֲבִיָּ֖ה	Ἀβίᾳ	Nehemiah 10:7; Nehemiah 12:4, 17. Zechariah, the father of John the Baptist, was of the course of Abijah (Luke 1:5; also spelled as "Abia"). Listed in the Yemeni inscription with the division number and place of residence.
11	9th	Jeshua	יֵשׁ֙וּעַ֙	Ἰησοῦ	Ezra 3:2; Ezra 5:2.This Hebrew name is rendered as Ἰησοῦς in Greek, and as "Jesus" in English. Listed in the Yemeni inscription with the division number and place of residence.
11	10th	Shecaniah	שְׁכַנְיָ֖הוּ	Σεχενίᾳ	Nehemiah 12:3; possibly "Shebaniah" in Nehemiah 10:4, Nehemiah 12:14. also in 1 Chronicles 3:21 Listed in the Yemeni inscription with the division number and place of residence.
12	11th	Eliashib	אֶלְיָשִׁיב֙	Ἐλιαβὶ	Nehemiah 13:4-7; also 1 Chronicles 3:24. Listed in the Yemeni inscription with the division number and place of residence.
12	12th	Jakim	יָקִ֖ים	Ἰακὶμ	Equivalent to Eliakim and Jecamiah (1 Chronicles 8:19). Listed in the Yemeni inscription with the division number and place of residence.
13	13th	Huppah	חֻפָּה֙	Ὀπφᾷ	Another use as "covering, canopy" in Isaiah 4:5; probably the same as "Huppim" in 1 Chronicles 7:12. Listed in the Yemeni inscription with the division number and place of residence.
13	14th	Jeshebeab	יֶֽשֶׁבְאָ֖ב	Ἰεσβαὰλ	Spelled in LXX as Ιεσβααλ or Ισβααλ, Eshbaal, "man of Baal"; Vulgate has "Isbaab." Listed in the Yemeni inscription with the division number and place of residence.
14	15th	Bilgah	בִלְגָּה֙	Βελγᾷ	Nehemiah 12:5; "Bilgai" in Nehemiah 10:8
14	16th	Immer	אִמֵּ֖ר	Ἐμμὴρ	1 Chronicles 9:12; Ezra 2:37; Jeremiah 20:1.
15	17th	Hezir	חֵזִיר֙	Χηζὶν	Listed in the Caesarea inscription with the division number and place of residence. Mentioned as a name of a layman in Nehemiah 10:20.
15	18th	Happizzez	הַפִּצֵּ֖ץ	Ἀφεσὴ	Listed in the Caesarea inscription with the division number and place of residence. Spelled in LXX as Αφεσση, in Vulgate as "Aphses;" in Syriac and Arabic as "Phasin."
16	19th	Pethahiah	פְתַחְיָה֙	Φεταίᾳ	Ezra 10:23; Nehemiah 9:5 Listed in the Caesarea inscription with the division number and place of residence.
16	20th	Jehezkel	יחֶזְקֵ֖אל	Ἐζεκὴλ	Listed in the Caesarea inscription with the division number and place of residence.
17	21st	Jachin	יָכִין֙	Ἀχὶμ	1 Chronicles 9:10; Nehemiah 11:10 Other mentions: Genesis 46:10; 1 Kings 7:21. The same name as Jehoiachin. probably "Achim" in Matthew 1:14
17	22nd	Gamul	גָמ֖וּל	Γαμοὺλ	Another use as "weaned" in Isaiah 11:8.
18	23rd	Delaiah	דְלָיָ֙הוּ֙	Ἀδαλλαὶ	1 Chronicles 3:24; Nehemiah 6:10; Nehemiah 7:62; Ezra 2:60.; spelled with the addition of a shurek (וּ) in Jeremiah 36:12, 25.
18	24th	Maaziah	מַֽעַזְיָ֖הוּ	Μαασαὶ	Nehemiah 10:8; probably "Maadiah" in Nehemiah 12:5.

== Remaining Levite assignments (24:20–31) ==
This section contains the list of Levites which overlaps with the one in 1 Chronicles 23:7–23. The Levites had similar rotation schedule as the priests (verse 31), and used the same system of drawing lots as the priests with almost the same witnesses, indicating that the Levites are considered as important as the priests.

== Document witnesses for priestly divisions ==
- Josephus wrote that David divided the Levites into twenty-four courses, sixteen of the house of Eleazar and eight of the house of Ithamar and he ordained each course to minister eight days, from Sabbath to Sabbath (Antiquities 7.14.7.).
- Babylonian Talmud has a statement by Rabbi Hama ben Guria that "Moses instituted for Israel eight Mishmaroth ("priestly divisions")—four from [the family of] Eleazar and four from [the family of] Ithamar; Samuel increased them to sixteen; David increased them to twenty four" (Taanith 27a).
- After the Temple destruction in 70 CE, there was a custom of publicly recalling the courses of the priests every Sabbath, a practice that reinforced the prestige of the priests' lineage. A manuscript discovered in the Cairo Geniza, dated 1034 CE, records a customary formula recited weekly in the synagogues, during the Sabbath day:

"Today is the holy Sabbath, the holy Sabbath unto the Lord; this day, which is the course? [Appropriate name] is the course. May the Merciful One return the course to its place soon, in our days. Amen."

After which, they would recount the number of years that have passed since the destruction of Jerusalem, and conclude with the words:

"May the Merciful One build his house and sanctuary, and let them say Amen."

- Three stone inscriptions were discovered bearing the names of the priestly wards, their order and the name of the locality to which they had moved after the destruction of the Second Temple:

1. In 1920, a marble stone inscription was found in Ashkelon showing a partial list of the priestly wards, attesting to the existence of such plaques, perhaps mounted to the walls of synagogues.

2. In 1962 three small fragments of one Hebrew stone inscription, dated to the 3rd/4th centuries, were found in Caesarea Maritima, bearing the partial names of places associated with the priestly courses (the rest of which had been reconstructed) as follows:

The 17th course Hezir Ma]mliah
The 18th course Hapizzez Nazareth
The 19th course Pethahia Akhlah Arab
The 20th course Ezekiel Mi]gdal Nunaiya

This is the oldest inscription mentioning Nazareth as a location, outside the Bible and pilgrim notes.

3. In 1970 the stone inscription DJE 23 was discovered on a partially buried column in a mosque, in the Yemeni village of Bayt Ḥaḍir, showing ten names of the priestly wards and their respective towns and villages. The Yemeni inscription is the longest roster of names of this sort ever discovered, unto this day. The names legible on the stone column discovered by Walter W. Müller read as follows:

English Translation	Original Hebrew
[Se'orim 'Ayṯoh-lo], fourth ward	שְׂעוֹרִים עיתהלו משמר הרביעי
[Malkiah, Beṯ]-Lehem, the fif[th] ward	מַלְכִּיָּה בית לחם משמר החמשי
Miyamin, Yudfaṯ (Jotapata), the sixth ward	מִיָמִין יודפת משמר הששי
[Haqo]ṣ, 'Ailebu, the seventh ward	הַקּוֹץ עילבו משמר השביעי
Aviah 'Iddo, Kefar 'Uzziel, the (eighth) ward	אֲבִיָּה עדו כפר עוזיאל משמר
the eighth (ward). Yešūa', Nišdaf-arbel	השמיני יֵשׁוּעַ נשדפארבל
the ninth ward	משמר התשיעי
Šekhaniyahu, 'Avurah Cabūl, the t[enth] ward	שְׁכַנְיָה עבורה כבול משמר העשירי
Eliašīv, Cohen Qanah, the elev[enth] ward	אֶלְיָשִׁיב כהן קנה משמר אחד עשר
Yaqīm Pašḥūr, Ṣefaṯ (Safed), the twelf[th] ward	יָקִים פַּשְׁחוּר צפת משמר שנים עשר
[Ḥū]ppah, Beṯ-Ma'on, the (thirteenth) ward	חוּפָּה בית מעון משמר שלשה
the thirteenth (ward). Yešav'av, Ḥuṣpiṯ Šuḥīn	עשר יֶשֶׁבְאָב חוצפית שוחין
the fourteenth wa[rd]	משמר ארבע עשר

- A seventh-century poet, Eleazar ben Killir, wrote a liturgical poem detailing the 24-priestly wards and their places of residence. Historian and geographer, Samuel Klein (1886–1940), thinks that Killir's poem proves the prevalence of this custom of commemorating the courses in the synagogues of the Land of Israel.

== See also ==
- Priestly divisions
- House of David
- Jerusalem
- Solomon's Temple
- Related Bible parts: Exodus 6, Deuteronomy 12, Numbers 3, Numbers 4, Numbers 8, 1 Chronicles 6, Ezra 3, Luke 1

== Sources ==
- Ackroyd, Peter R (1993). "Chronicles, Books of". In Metzger, Bruce M; Coogan, Michael D (eds.). The Oxford Companion to the Bible. Oxford University Press. pp. 113–116. ISBN 978-0-19-504645-8.
- Avi-Yonah, Michael (1962). "A List of Priestly Courses from Caesarea". Israel Exploration Journal. 12 (2): 137–139. JSTOR 27924896.
- Bennett, William (2018). The Expositor's Bible: The Books of Chronicles. Litres. ISBN 978-5-04-082519-6.
- Coogan, Michael David (2007). Coogan, Michael David; Brettler, Marc Zvi; Newsom, Carol Ann; Perkins, Pheme (eds.). The New Oxford Annotated Bible with the Apocryphal/Deuterocanonical Books: New Revised Standard Version, Issue 48 (Augmented 3rd ed.). Oxford University Press. ISBN 978-0-19-528881-0.
- Endres, John C. (2012). First and Second Chronicles. Liturgical Press. ISBN 978-0-8146-2844-7.
- Hill, Andrew E. (2003). First and Second Chronicles. Zondervan. ISBN 978-0-310-20610-1.
- Mabie, Frederick (2017). "I. The Chronicler's Genealogical Survey of All Israel". In Longman III, Tremper; Garland, David E (eds.). 1 and 2 Chronicles. The Expositor's Bible Commentary. Zondervan. pp. 267–308. ISBN 978-0-310-53181-4.
- Mathys, H. P. (2007). "14. 1 and 2 Chronicles". In Barton, John; Muddiman, John (eds.). The Oxford Bible Commentary (first (paperback) ed.). Oxford University Press. pp. 267–308. ISBN 978-0-19-927718-6.
- Tuell, Steven S. (2012). First and Second Chronicles. Westminster John Knox Press. ISBN 978-0-664-23865-0.
- Wise, Michael; Abegg, Martin Jr.; Cook, Edward (1996). The Dead Sea Scrolls: A New Translation. San Francisco: Harper. pp. 296–323. ISBN 0-06-069201-4.
- Würthwein, Ernst (1995). The Text of the Old Testament. Translated by Rhodes, Erroll F. Grand Rapids, MI: William B. Eerdmans. ISBN 0-8028-0788-7.
