= Nehemiah 12 =

Chapter in the Old Testament Book of Nehemiah

- ← chapter 11 chapter 13 →
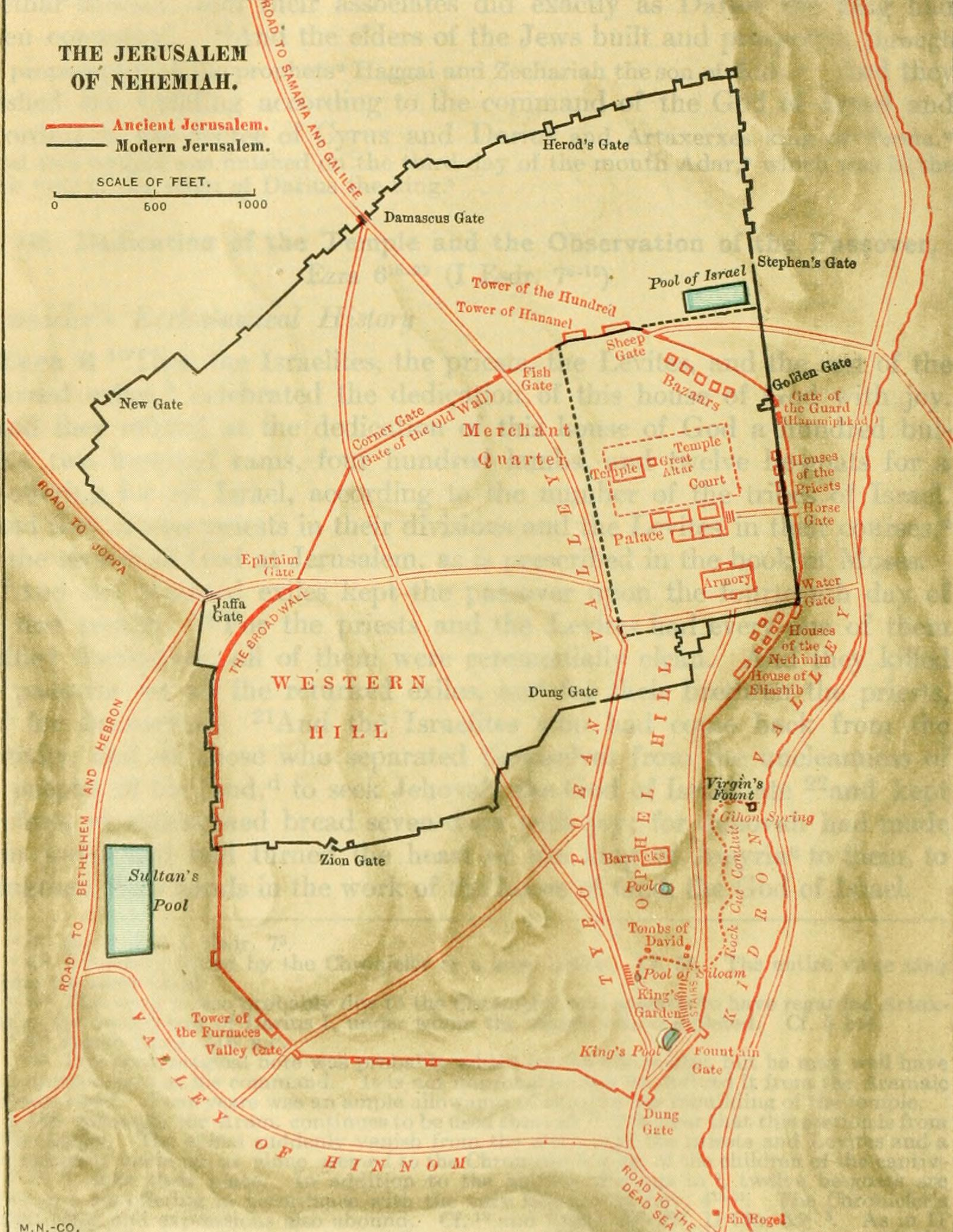
- Map of Jerusalem in Nehemiah's time. The Student's Old Testament (1904) by Charles Foster Kent (1867-1925)
- Book: Book of Nehemiah
- Category: Ketuvim
- Christian Bible part: Old Testament
- Order in the Christian part: 16

Nehemiah 12 is the twelfth chapter of the Book of Nehemiah in the Old Testament of the Christian Bible, or the 22nd chapter of the book of Ezra-Nehemiah in the Hebrew Bible, which treats the book of Ezra and the book of Nehemiah as one book. Jewish tradition states that Ezra is the author of Ezra-Nehemiah as well as the Book of Chronicles, but modern scholars generally accept that a compiler from the 5th century BCE (the so-called "Chronicler") is the final author of these books. This chapter recounts the lineage of the priests and Levites and describes the dedication of the walls of Jerusalem, whose construction has been a primary concern since the beginning of the book.

== Text ==
The original text of this chapter is in Hebrew language. This chapter is divided into 47 verses.

=== Textual witnesses ===
Some early manuscripts containing the text of this chapter in Hebrew are of the Masoretic Text, which includes Codex Leningradensis (1008). (Note: Since the anti-Jewish riots in Aleppo in 1947, the whole book of Ezra-Nehemiah has been missing from the text of the Aleppo Codex.)

There is also a translation into Koine Greek known as the Septuagint, made in the last few centuries BCE. Extant ancient manuscripts of the Septuagint version include Codex Vaticanus (B; $\mathfrak{G}$^{B}; 4th century), Codex Sinaiticus (S; BHK: $\mathfrak{G}$^{S}; 4th century), and Codex Alexandrinus (A; $\mathfrak{G}$^{A}; 5th century).

== Priests and Levites (12:1–26) ==
This part records the several lists of priests and Levites to document the genuineness of the Jewish community and its religious authority, in order to give legitimacy in this postexilic community. The list starts with those said to have returned with Zerubbabel in the first wave at the time of the Persian king, Cyrus (verses 1–9), but this list is quite different from the one in Ezra 2. After listing the high priests from the last one at the time of exile, Jozadak, the father of Jeshua, until Jaddua (verses 10–11), it records those returning at the time of Ezra (verses 12–21), with a careful note on its sources (verses 22–23).

=== Verse 1 ===
Now these are the priests and the Levites that went up with Zerubbabel the son of Shealtiel, and Jeshua:

Seraiah, Jeremiah, Ezra,

- "Zerubbabel" was the leader of the group and of Davidic line (1 Chronicles 3:19), so he is associated with the messianic hope in the book of Zechariah, although this association is not mentioned in this book. His office is not named in this book, but he is identified as the "governor of Judah" in Haggai 1:1, 14; 2:2.
- "Jeshua": or "Joshua". His office is not named in this book, but he is identified as the "high priest" in Haggai 1:1, 12, 14; 2:2; Zechariah 3:1.

=== Verse 3 ===
Shecaniah, Rehum, Meremoth,

- "Shecaniah": the name of the tenth of "24 Priestly Divisions" in 1 Chronicles 24. This name appears in a stone inscription that was found in 1970 on a partially buried column in a mosque, in the Yemeni village of Bayt al-Ḥaḍir, among the ten names of priestly wards and their respective towns and villages. This "Yemeni inscription" is the longest roster of names of this sort ever discovered, unto this day. The names legible on the stone column discovered by Walter W. Müller. It is spelled as "Shebaniah" in Nehemiah 12:14 (cf. Nehemiah 10:4; 1 Chronicles 3:21).
- "Rehum": spelled as "Harim" in Nehemiah 12:15.
- "Meremoth": spelled as "Meraioth" in Nehemiah 12:15.

=== Verse 4 ===
Iddo, Ginnethoi, Abijah,

- "Ginnethoi": spelled as "Ginnethon" in a number of Hebrew manuscripts and the Latin Vulgate version (cf. Nehemiah 12:16 and NIV, NCV, NLT).
- "Abijah": the name of the eighth of "24 Priestly Divisions" in 1 Chronicles 24. Zechariah, the father of John the Baptist, was a member of this division (Luke 1:5; also spelled as "Abia"). This name appears in the "Yemeni inscription", found in 1970 in the Yemeni village of Bayt al-Ḥaḍir, among the ten names of priestly wards and their respective towns and villages (cf. verse 3 "Shecaniah").

=== Verse 5 ===
Mijamin, Maadiah, Bilgah,

- "Mijamin": from Hebrew מִיָּמִ֥ין; the name of the sixth of "24 Priestly Divisions" in 1 Chronicles 24 (spelled as מִיָּמִ֖ן). This name appears in the "Yemeni inscription", found in 1970 in the Yemeni village of Bayt al-Ḥaḍir, among the ten names of priestly wards and their respective towns and villages (cf. verse 3 "Shecaniah"). It is spelled as "Minjamin" (מִ֨נְיָמִ֔ין) in Nehemiah 12:17.
- "Maadiah": from Hebrew מַֽעַדְיָ֖ה, spelled as "Moadiah" (מוֹעַדְיָ֖ה) in Nehemiah 12:17. Probably is the same as "Maaziah" (מַֽעַזְיָ֖הוּ), the name of the twenty-fourth of "24 Priestly Divisions" in 1 Chronicles 24.
- "Bilgah": The name of the fifteenth of "24 Priestly Divisions" in 1 Chronicles 24 (cf. Nehemiah 10:8).

=== Verse 15 ===
of Harim, Adna;
of Meraioth, Helkai;

- "Harim": the name of the third of "24 Priestly Divisions" in 1 Chronicles 24 (cf. Nehemiah 10:5, spelled as "Rehum" in Nehemiah 12:3). One fragment of Dead Sea Scrolls (4Q325; "Mishmarot D") mentions:

The beginning of the se[cond] month is [on the si]xth [day] of the course of Jedaiah. On the second of the month is the Sabbath of the course of Harim....

- "Meraioth": spelled as "Meremoth" in Nehemiah 12:3 (cf. Nehemiah 10:5).

=== Verse 17 ===
of Abijah, Zichri;
the son of Minjamin;
of Moadiah, Piltai;

- "Abijah": the name of the eighth of "24 Priestly Divisions" in 1 Chronicles 24. Zechariah, the father of John the Baptist, was a member of this division (Luke 1:5; also spelled as "Abia"). This name appears in the "Yemeni inscription", found in 1970 in the Yemeni village of Bayt al-Ḥaḍir, among the ten names of priestly wards and their respective towns and villages (cf. verse 3 "Shecaniah").
- "Minjamin": from Hebrew מִ֨נְיָמִ֔ין; spelled as "Mijamin" (מִיָּמִ֥ין) in Nehemiah 12:5, the name of the sixth of "24 Priestly Divisions" in 1 Chronicles 24 (spelled as מִיָּמִ֖ן). This name appears in the "Yemeni inscription" among the ten names of priestly wards and their respective towns and villages (cf. verse 3 "Shecaniah").
- "Moadiah": from Hebrew מוֹעַדְיָ֖ה; spelled as "Maadiah" (מַֽעַדְיָ֖ה) in Nehemiah 12:5. Probably is the same as "Maaziah" (מַֽעַזְיָ֖הוּ), the name of the twenty-fourth of "24 Priestly Divisions" in 1 Chronicles 24.

== Joyous dedication (12:27–43) ==
These verses describe the joyous dedication of the completed work orchestrated by Nehemiah, within the frame of a symmetrically ordered structure as follows:

A Preparations for joyous dedication (verses 27–30)

B Two companies appointed (verse 31a)

C One goes to the right upon the wall (verses 31b, 37)
C' One goes to the left upon the wall (verses 38–39)

B' Two companies meet and stand at the house of God (verse 40)

A' Performance of joyous dedication (verse 43)

The exuberant tone of this passage is indicated by the framework of "joy" which brackets this section (verse 27, five times in verse 43), as the final exposition after previous use in some turning points in the narrative:

- Ezra 3:12–13: the laying of the foundations
- Ezra 6:16: the dedication of the temple
- Nehemiah 8:12: the people's initial response to Ezra's reading of the law

Two lists of participants are recorded in verses 32–36 and 41–42, and also display a remarkable symmetry:

- First Company, processing to the right (verses 32–36):

A. Hoshaiah and half of the princes of Judah (verse 32)

B. Seven priests with trumpets (verses 33–35a)

C. Zechariah and eight Levitical instrumentalists (verses 35b–36a)

X. Ezra, the scribe (verse 36b)

- Second Company, processing to the left (verses 38–42)

A. Nehemiah and half of people/officials (verses 38–40)

B. Seven priests with trumpets (verse 41)

C. Jezrahaiah and eight Levitical singers (verse 42)

=== Verse 36 ===
And his brethren, Shemaiah, and Azarael, Milalai, Gilalai, Maai, Nethaneel, and Judah, Hanani, with the musical instruments of David the man of God,
and Ezra the scribe before them.

- "Of David": or "prescribed by David" (NIV, NLT); TEV "of the kind played by David," but 'the precise relationship of these musical instruments to David is not clear'.

The appearance of "Ezra, the scribe" (verse 36b) provides the primary evidence for the contemporaneity of Ezra and Nehemiah.

=== Verse 39 ===
And from above the gate of Ephraim, and above the old gate, and above the fish gate, and the tower of Hananeel, and the tower of Meah, even unto the sheep gate: and they stood still in the prison gate.

- "Tower of Hananeel": a well-known landmark, which is mentioned also in Nehemiah 3:1; Jeremiah 31:38; Zechariah 14:10, standing midway between "the sheep gate" and "the fish gate", at the northeast corner of Jerusalem, then from this point, the wall which had run northwestern from the sheep gate now turned to west.

=== Verse 42 ===
And Maaseiah, and Shemaiah, and Eleazar, and Uzzi, and Jehohanan, and Malchijah, and Elam, and Ezer. And the singers sang loud, with Jezrahiah their overseer.

- "Sang loud": in Hebrew literally "made their voice to be heard".

=== Verse 43 ===
Also that day they offered great sacrifices, and rejoiced: for God had made them rejoice with great joy: the wives also and the children rejoiced: so that the joy of Jerusalem was heard even afar off.

The words "joy" and "rejoice" occur five times in this sentence: "this verse is full of joy; but before the rejoicing comes the abundant offering of sacrifices." Methodist commentator Joseph Benson notes that the security of the walls meant that "they could praise the Lord there without disturbance or fear".

== The organization of worship (12:44–47) ==
The last part of this chapter focuses on the priests and Levites who help people worship God in the Temple, as their needs were taken care by the same people. David was mentioned twice, indicating that the people were emulating the traditions established since the time 'God directed David to establish the Temple'. Verse 47 also confirms that the pattern of bringing food for Temple workers was already observed from the time of Zerubbabel when the Temple was rebuilt, and consistently practiced until the time of Nehemiah. This explains the anger of Nehemiah a few years later when he heard the people stopped providing the needs of the Temple workers (Nehemiah 13:10–13).

=== Verse 44 ===
And at that time were some appointed over the chambers for the treasures, for the offerings, for the firstfruits, and for the tithes, to gather into them out of the fields of the cities the portions of the law for the priests and Levites: for Judah rejoiced for the priests and for the Levites that waited.

- "Out of the fields": The translation reads מִשְּׂדֵי (missede, "from the fields") rather than the MT reading לִשְׂדֵי (lisde, "to the fields").
- "For Judah": here in the sense of "the people of Judah", as "Judah" can be 'a proper name as well as a place name'.
- "Waited": Hebrew: "stood", NKJV: "ministered"; or "standing", NET Bible: "were ministering".

== See also ==
- Jerusalem
- High Priest of Israel
- Related Bible parts: Ezra 2, Nehemiah 7, Nehemiah 10

== Sources ==
- Fensham, F. Charles (1982). The Books of Ezra and Nehemiah. New international commentary on the Old Testament (illustrated ed.). Wm. B. Eerdmans Publishing. ISBN 978-0-8028-2527-8.
- Grabbe, Lester L. (2003). "Nehemiah". In Dunn, James D. G.; Rogerson, John William (eds.). Eerdmans Commentary on the Bible (illustrated ed.). Wm. B. Eerdmans Publishing. pp. 320–328. ISBN 978-0-8028-3711-0.
- Halley, Henry H. (1965). Halley's Bible Handbook: an abbreviated Bible commentary (24th (revised) ed.). Zondervan Publishing House. ISBN 0-310-25720-4.
- Larson, Knute; Dahlen, Kathy; Anders, Max E. (2005). Anders, Max E. (ed.). Holman Old Testament Commentary - Ezra, Nehemiah, Esther. Vol. 9 (illustrated ed.). B&H Publishing Group. ISBN 978-0-8054-9469-3.
- Levering, Matthew (2007). Ezra & Nehemiah. Brazos Theological Commentary on the Bible. Brazos Press. ISBN 978-1-58743-161-6.
- McConville, J. G. (1985). Ezra, Nehemiah, and Esther. The daily study Bible : Old Testament. Westminster John Knox Press. ISBN 978-0-664-24583-2.
- Smith, Gary (2018). Ezra, Nehemiah, Esther. Cornerstone Biblical Commentary. Vol. 5. Tyndale House. ISBN 978-1-4143-9912-6.
- Smith-Christopher, Daniel L. (2007). "15. Ezra-Nehemiah". In Barton, John; Muddiman, John (eds.). The Oxford Bible Commentary (first (paperback) ed.). Oxford University Press. pp. 308–324. ISBN 978-0-19-927718-6.
- Throntveit, Mark A. (1992). Ezra-Nehemiah. John Knox Press.
- Wise, Michael; Abegg, Martin Jr.; Cook, Edward (1996). The Dead Sea Scrolls: A New Translation. San Francisco: Harper. pp. 296–323. ISBN 0-06-069201-4.
- Würthwein, Ernst (1995). The Text of the Old Testament. Translated by Rhodes, Erroll F. Grand Rapids, MI: Wm. B. Eerdmans. ISBN 0-8028-0788-7.
