= 1 Chronicles 9 =

First Book of Chronicles, chapter 9

- ← chapter 8 chapter 10 →
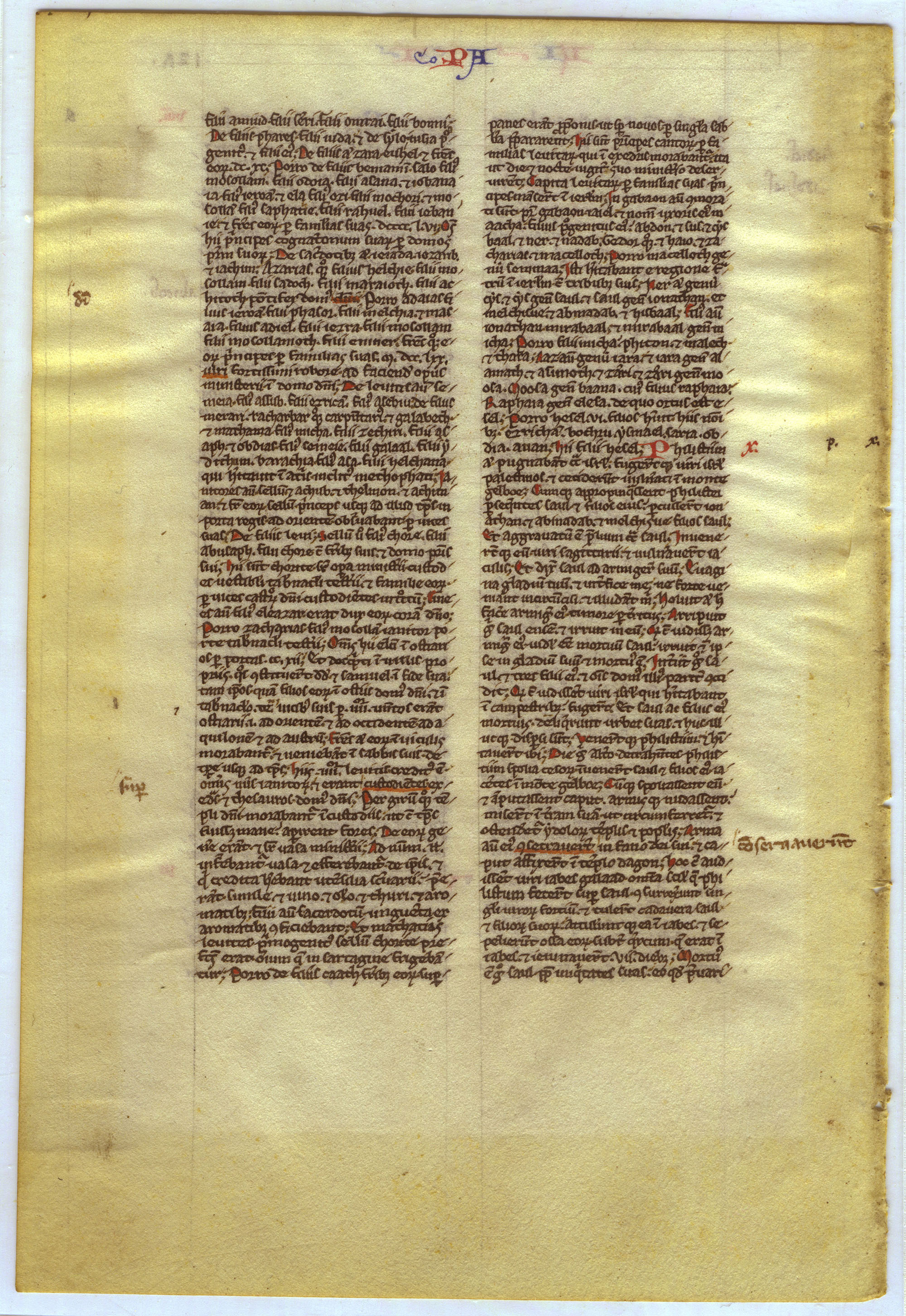
- 1 Chronicles 7:9-10:13. Vellum leaf from c. 1240 France, pearl script.
- Book: Books of Chronicles
- Category: Ketuvim
- Christian Bible part: Old Testament
- Order in the Christian part: 13

1 Chronicles 9 is the ninth chapter of the Books of Chronicles in the Hebrew Bible or the First Book of Chronicles in the Old Testament of the Christian Bible. The book is compiled from older sources by an unknown person or group, designated by modern scholars as "the Chronicler", and had the final shape established in late fifth or fourth century BCE. This chapter contains list of Jerusalem's inhabitants in the post-exilic period (verses 1–34), and closes with the family of Saul (verses 35–44), an almost literal repetition of the list of descendants in 1 Chronicles 8:29–38. The first part of the chapter (verses 1–34) belongs to the section focusing on the list of genealogies from Adam to the lists of the people returning from exile in Babylon (1 Chronicles 1:1 to 9:34), whereas the second part (verses 35–44) belongs to the section focusing on the kingship of David (1 Chronicles 9:35 to 29:30).

== Text ==
This chapter was originally written in the Hebrew language. It is divided into 44 verses.

=== Textual witnesses ===
Some early manuscripts containing the text of this chapter in Hebrew are of the Masoretic Text tradition, which includes the Aleppo Codex (10th century), and Codex Leningradensis (1008).

There is also a translation into Koine Greek known as the Septuagint, made in the last few centuries BCE. Extant ancient manuscripts of the Septuagint version include Codex Vaticanus (B; $\mathfrak{G}$^{B}; 4th century), Codex Sinaiticus (S; BHK: $\mathfrak{G}$^{S}; 4th century (Note: The extant Codex Sinaiticus only contains 1 Chronicles 9:27–19:17.)), Codex Alexandrinus (A; $\mathfrak{G}$^{A}; 5th century) and Codex Marchalianus (Q; $\mathfrak{G}$^{Q}; 6th century).

=== Old Testament references ===
- 1 Chronicles 9:35–44: 1 Chronicles 8:29–38.

== Returned exiles in Jerusalem (9:1–16) ==
This section contains a list of people returning from Babylonian exile to Jerusalem, in following order: Israel (non-clerics, naming four tribes: Judah, Benjamin, Ephraim, Manasseh; verses 1–9), priests (verses 10–13), and Levites (verses 14–16). Verses 2–17 were probably adapted from Nehemiah 11:3-19.

=== Verse 1 ===
So all Israel were reckoned by genealogies; and, behold, they were written in the book of the kings of Israel and Judah, who were carried away to Babylon for their transgression.

- "Reckoned": "recorded" or "enrolled".
- "Book of the kings of Israel and Judah": also used in 2 Chronicles 27:7 and 36:8, whereas a factually identical expression, "Book of the kings of Israel", is used in 2 Chronicles 20:34 (cf. 33:18).
- "Carried away to Babylon": reoccurs in 2 Chronicles 36:20.

=== Verse 2 ===
And the first inhabitants who dwelt in their possessions in their cities were Israelites, priests, Levites, and the Nethinim.

- Cross reference: Nehemiah 11:3
- "The first": refers to the people returning the earliest from exile. Other translations are rendered 'the main, most important residents', 'the first inhabitants from old'. Compared to Nehemiah 11:3, the words/phrases 'province' as well as 'and the descendants of Solomon's servants', are omitted by the Chronicler.

=== Verse 3 ===
And in Jerusalem dwelt of the children of Judah, and of the children of Benjamin, and of the children of Ephraim, and Manasseh;

- "Ephraim, and Manasseh": is a unique information in the Chronicles, implying that some 'residents of the northern kingdom who were loyal to YHWH and repeatedly called upon to find asylum in Judah/Jerusalem on religious grounds' have indeed repeatedly heeded the calls.

=== Verse 10 ===
And of the priests; Jedaiah, and Jehoiarib, and Jachin,

- "Jedaiah": The name of the second of "24 Priestly Divisions" in 1 Chronicles 24. One fragment of Dead Sea Scrolls (4Q325; "Mishmarot D") mentions:

"The beginning of the se[cond] month is [on the si]xth [day] of the course of Jedaiah. On the second of the month is the Sabbath of the course of Harim...."

- "Jehoiarib": The name of the first of "24 Priestly Divisions" in 1 Chronicles 24. In Talmud Arakhin 11b Rabbi Yosei ben Halafta states that when Solomon's Temple was burnt on the ninth of Ab [586 BCE] the 'priestly guard' was of Jehoiarib division, and they were singing Psalm 94, but only to the first half of Psalm 94:23 (until "their own wickedness") before 'the enemies came and overwhelmed them'. Mattathias ben Johanan was a descendant of Jehoiarib according to 1 Maccabees 2:1.
- "Jachin": The name of the twenty-first of "24 Priestly Divisions" in 1 Chronicles 24.

== The gatekeepers (9:17–34) ==
The gatekeepers (or 'porters') are described at length as members of the Levite families (cf. Nehemiah 11:19ff; they are listed separately from other 'Levites'), with specific duties (verses 18–19) to guard 'thresholds of the tent' as well as the entrances. These duties were established during the desert-dwelling period and had not changed since that time. These gatekeepers are different from the singers, who only began to hold their office when their job as bearers of the ark became unnecessary (cf. 1 Chronicles 6:13). Apart from guard duties, the gatekeepers were also in charge of utensils, furniture, materials for service, and baking the flat cakes and "rows of bread" (cf. Leviticus 24:5–9). 1 Chronicles 26:1–19 also give special attention to gatekeepers.

== The family of King Saul (9:35–44) ==
This section focuses on the genealogy of Saul, the first ruler of Israel, nearly identical to the list in 1 Chronicles 8:29–38, to conclude the genealogies of the tribes of Israel.

=== Verse 39 ===
And Ner begat Kish, and Kish begat Saul, and Saul begat Jonathan, and Malchishua, and Abinadab, and Eshbaal.

- "Eshbaal": from Hebrew: meaning "man of Baal", probably the original name of Saul's son that was 'corrected and disfigured' in 2 Samuel 2:8 (etc.) into "Ishbosheth" (meaning "man of shame"), to conceal the 'baal' component (which can be related to the Canaanite god, "Baal"; also the name "Baal" in verse 30 and "Meribbaal" in verse 34). In 1 Samuel 14:49, he is known as "Ishvi".

=== Verse 40 ===
And the son of Jonathan was Meribbaal: and Meribbaal begat Micah.

- "Meribbaal": written as "Mephibosheth" in 2 Samuel 4:4.

== See also ==
- Chronology of the Bible
- David and Jonathan
- House of Saul
- Levite
- Related Bible parts: Genesis 46, Numbers 26, 2 Samuel 2, 1 Chronicles 8, 1 Chronicles 10, 1 Chronicles 26, Nehemiah 11

== Sources ==
- Ackroyd, Peter R (1993). "Chronicles, Books of". In Metzger, Bruce M; Coogan, Michael D (eds.). The Oxford Companion to the Bible. Oxford University Press. pp. 113–116. ISBN 978-0-19-504645-8.
- Bennett, William (2018). The Expositor's Bible: The Books of Chronicles. Litres. ISBN 978-5-04-082519-6.
- Coogan, Michael David (2007). Coogan, Michael David; Brettler, Marc Zvi; Newsom, Carol Ann; Perkins, Pheme (eds.). The New Oxford Annotated Bible with the Apocryphal/Deuterocanonical Books: New Revised Standard Version, Issue 48 (Augmented 3rd ed.). Oxford University Press. ISBN 978-0-19-528881-0.
- Endres, John C. (2012). First and Second Chronicles. Liturgical Press. ISBN 978-0-8146-2844-7.
- Hill, Andrew E. (2003). First and Second Chronicles. Zondervan. ISBN 978-0-310-20610-1.
- Mabie, Frederick (2017). "I. The Chronicler's Genealogical Survey of All Israel". In Longman III, Tremper; Garland, David E (eds.). 1 and 2 Chronicles. The Expositor's Bible Commentary. Zondervan. pp. 267–308. ISBN 978-0-310-53181-4.
- Mathys, H. P. (2007). "14. 1 and 2 Chronicles". In Barton, John; Muddiman, John (eds.). The Oxford Bible Commentary (first (paperback) ed.). Oxford University Press. pp. 267–308. ISBN 978-0-19-927718-6.
- Tuell, Steven S. (2012). First and Second Chronicles. Westminster John Knox Press. ISBN 978-0-664-23865-0.
- Wise, Michael; Abegg, Martin Jr.; Cook, Edward (1996). The Dead Sea Scrolls: A New Translation. San Francisco: Harper. pp. 296–323. ISBN 0-06-069201-4.
- Würthwein, Ernst (1995). The Text of the Old Testament. Translated by Rhodes, Erroll F. Grand Rapids, MI: William B. Eerdmans. ISBN 0-8028-0788-7.
