= DJE 23 =

Hebrew inscription in Yemen

DJE 23 is a Jewish inscription in Hebrew, dated to the 4th or 5th century CE, engraved on a stone pillar in South Arabia, 15 km southeast of Sanaa, Yemen, in the village of Bayt Hadir. The inscription comes from the time of the Kingdom of Himyar, during which time Judaism was practiced by the Himyarite elites.

The inscription is based on a passage from the Bible (1 Chronicles 24): it is a list of the priestly divisions of the Temple in Jerusalem, one of the holiest sites of Judaism. Priests of the Temple had organized into divisions to help facilitate the service at the Temple. The function of reproducing these lists, at a time when the Temple had already been destroyed centuries ago in the Jewish–Roman wars of the first century, served to express hope for the reconstruction of the Temple one day in the future. A synagogue probably existed nearby, as a contemporary Sabaic inscription reads: "Amen, Amen. This house is a place of prayer."

== Discovery and publication ==
The inscription was discovered independently on two occasions. The first discovery took place in the Deutsche-Jemen Expedition of 1970. It was discovered again by Piotr A. Grjaznevič in 1971. The first announcement of the finding of the inscription was in a note by Walter W. Müller in 1973. A full publication of the inscription, for the first time, happened in a 1973 paper in Hebrew by Rainer Degan and then in a 1974 paper in German. A seminal study was published on it in 1973 as well, by Ephraim Urbach. Later, Maria Gorea published an edition of the inscription alongside a study of it in 2015 in French.

== Text ==
Editions of the inscription exist only in German and French. The 2015 French edition of Gorea benefits from access to new photographs taken by Christian Julien Robin that help make out elements of the inscription previously difficult to reconstruct.

Transliteration (Gorea 2015)

1. [Ś]ʿrym [ʿytlw] mšmr hrbyʿy

2. [Mlkyh] Byt Lḥm mšmr hḥmyšy

3. Mymyn Ywdpt mšmr hššy

4. Hqwṣ ʿylbw mšmr hšbyʿy

5. ʾbyh ʿdw Kpr ʿzyʾl mšmr

6. hšmwny Yšwʿ Nśrp ʾrbʾl

7. mšmr htšyʿy

8. Šknyh ʿbwrh Kbwl mšmr h[ʿśyry]

9. ʾlyšyb khn Qnh mšmr ʾḥd ʿ[śr]

10. Yqym Pšḥwr Ṣpt mšmr šnym ʿ[śr]

11. [Ḥw]ph Byt Mʿwn mšmr šlšh

12. [ʿś]r Yšbʾb Ḥwṣpyt Šwḥyn

13. [mš]mr ʾrbʿh ʿśr

Hebrew translation (Degan 1973)

שְׂעוֹרִים עיתהלו משמר הרביעי

מַלְכִּיָּה בית לחם משמר החמשי

מִיָמִין יודפת משמר הששי

הַקּוֹץ עילבו משמר השביעי

אֲבִיָּה עדו כפר עוזיאל משמר

השמיני יֵשׁוּעַ נשדפארבל

משמר התשיעי

שְׁכַנְיָה עבורה כבול משמר העשירי

אֶלְיָשִׁיב כהן קנה משמר אחד עשר

יָקִים פַּשְׁחוּר צפת משמר שנים עשר

חוּפָּה בית מעון משמר שלשה

עשר יֶשֶׁבְאָב חוצפית שוחין

משמר ארבע עשר

English translation

[Se‘orim ‘Ayṯoh-lo], fourth ward

[Malkiah, Beṯ]-Lehem, the fif[th] ward

Miyamin, Yudfaṯ (Jotapata), the sixth ward

[Haqo]ṣ, ‘Ailebu, the seventh ward

Aviah ‘Iddo, Kefar ‘Uzziel, the (eighth) ward

the eighth (ward). Yešūa‘, Nišdaf-arbel

the ninth ward

Šekhaniyahu, ‘Avurah Cabūl, the t[enth] ward

Eliašīv, Cohen Qanah, the elev[enth] ward

Yaqīm Pašḥūr, Ṣefaṯ (Safed), the twelf[th] ward

[Ḥū]ppah, Beṯ-Ma‘on, the (thirteenth) ward

the thirteenth (ward). Yešav’av, Ḥuṣpiṯ Šuḥīn

the fourteenth wa[rd]

== Interpretation and significance ==
The inscription lists the mishmarot ("guards"), enumerating the twenty-four Priestly divisions (and each of their places of residence in Galilee) that were appointed to protect the Solomon's Temple after the return of the Jews that were expelled during the Babylonian exile. In the Bible, these Priestly divisions are listed in 1 Chronicles 24:7–8, Nehemiah 10:2–8, and Nehemiah 12:1–7. However, DJE 23 strictly follows the list as presented in the Book of Chronicles. The surviving portion of DJE 23 only contains the name of eleven of the mishmarot. The inscription is also written in biblical as opposed to Aramaic orthography. The term mishmarot is not biblical, but is first attested in Qumran and then in rabbinic literature.

DJE 23 has variously been interpreted as providing evidence for the existence of an either Priestly or rabbinic form of Judaism in southern Arabia. It may have been produced by the Jewish community at Tanʿim.

== See also ==
- Judaism in pre-Islamic Arabia
- Christian community of Najran
- Himyarite Kingdom
- Ruwafa inscriptions
- Paleo-Arabic

== Sources ==
- Debie, Muriel (2024). "The Arabs and Northern Languages and Scripts before Islam". In Vacca, Alison; Borrut, Antoine; Ceballos, Manuela (eds.). Navigating Language in the Early Islamic World: Multilingualism and Language Change in the First Centuries of Islam. Brepols. pp. 195–257.
- Gajda, Iwona (2026). "Religions of Ancient South Arabia From Polytheism to Monotheism in the Context of Political, Economic and Social Evolutions (Fourth–Sixth Centuries CE)". Arabian Archaeology and Epigraphy: 1–18.
