= Nethinim =

Temple assistants in ancient Jerusalem

Nethinim (נְתִינִים nəṯīnīm, lit. "given ones", or "subjects"), or Nathinites or Nathineans, was the name given to the Temple assistants in ancient Jerusalem. The term was applied originally in the Book of Joshua (where it is found in its verbal form) to the Gibeonites. (Note: Joshua 9:27) Later, in the Book of Ezra, they are counted alongside the Avdei Shlomo ("Servants of Solomon"). It is likely that the Nethinim descended from non-Israelites. Opinion is divided as to whether the Gibeonites in Joshua are to be connected to the Nethinim of later texts. Others theorize that they were the descendants of Midianite war captives, as described in Numbers 31.

== Etymology ==
Netinim is derived from the Canaanite verb N-T-N, "to give." The noun form occurs 18 times in the Masoretic Text of the Hebrew Bible, always in the plural (1 Chr. 9:2; Ezra 2:43,58,70; 7:7,24; 8:17,20; Neh. 3:26,31; 7:46,60,73; 10:28; 11:3,21). (Note: e.g. Theologisches Wörterbuch zum Alten Testament English edition The Theological Dictionary of the Old Testament Vol.10 ed. Ringren, entry N-T-N "Netinim" mentioned pp. 102, 105, 106, 107)

=== Translations and spellings ===
In English, Nethinim is one of several Hebrew words which are transliterated rather than translated in the King James Version (1611). It is also the most common academic spelling. The form Nathinites is found in the Douay-Rheims Version and consequently in the Catholic Encyclopedia (1911) article "Nathinites".

In Greek, the Septuagint transliterates Nethinim as οἱ Ναθιναῖοι, hoi Nathinaioi (Ezra 2:43; Neh 11:3), and as Ναθινιν (Ezra 2:58); and on one occasion, translated into Greek as οἱ δεδομένοι hoi dedoménoi, "the given ones" (1 Chron 9:2). Josephus renders the term as ἰερόδουλοι ierodouloi "temple servants". The Vulgate has Latin: Nathinæi. In Syriac the Peshitta follows the Hebrew, except that 1 Chronicles 9 renders netinim with Syriac geyora pl., equivalent of Hebrew gerim.

== Hebrew Bible ==
In the Book of Joshua, the Nethinim are mentioned in a passage concerning the "leaders (nesi'im) of the congregation", a term also utilized in the ruling assembling of post-exilic Yehud Medinata. The passage has been read as one that confers legitimacy on this class, or, alternatively, criticizing them for acting autonomously. In the latter regard, it is contended that the author of Joshua blames these leaders, independently of the priesthood, for inducting the Gibeonites into cultic service in Jerusalem. In Talmudic tradition, they became associated with the Nethinim.

The Nethinim are mentioned at the return from the Exile and particularly enumerated in Ezra 2 and Neh 7. The original form of the name was Nethunim, as in the ketiv (consonantal reading) of Ezra 8:17 (cf. Numbers 3:9), and means "given" or "dedicated," i.e., to the temple. The Talmud also uses the singular form Nathin. In all, 612 Nethinim came back from the Exile and were lodged near the "House of the Nethinim" at Ophel, towards the east wall of Jerusalem so as to be near the Temple, where they served under the Levites and were free of all tolls, from which they must have been supported. They are ordered by David and the princes to serve the Levites (Ezra 8:20). The men of Gibeon, with Melatiah the Gibeonite at their head, repaired a piece of the wall of Jerusalem near the old gate on the west side of the city (Neh. iii. 7), while the Nethinim dwelt at Ophel on the east side (ib. 26).

Many of the names enumerated in Ezra 2 for the Nethinim appear to indicate a foreign provenance, including people of Arab, Ishmaelite, Egyptian, Edomite and Aramaic ethnicities, with nicknames appropriate to slaves. (Note: The nicknames are of the type: "Speedy, White, Crooked, Taciturn, and Faithful." (Dunham 2016, p. 134)) Most of the names of the parents mentioned seem to be feminine in form or meaning, and suggest that the Nethinim could not trace back to any definite paternity; and this is supported by the enumeration of those who could not "show their father's house" (Ezra 2:60; Neh 7:62).

== Interpretations ==
=== Rabbinical Judaism ===
At the time of Nehemiah and Ezra, they were fully integrated into the Judean community, and were signatories to the former's covenant. Several centuries later, their status had declined rapidly. In the 10 genealogical classes (yuhasin) set forth in the Mishnah, they are ranked above shetukim (people of whose paternity is unknown) and assufim (foundlings) but beneath mamzerim, the offspring of illicit unions, and were prohibited from marrying Israellites of good standing, though intermarriage between the last four classes, which included freed slaves, was permitted. A child of such illicit unions was defined as a natin. Whereas the Biblical prohibitions against intermarriage with the Moabites, Ammonites, Egyptians and Edomites only applied for a certain number of generations or did not apply at all to their daughters, the ban on marriage with Mamzerim and Nethinim was deemed "perpetual and applies both to males and females".

=== Jehovah's Witnesses ===
Jehovah's Witnesses use the term Nethinim to refer to members not claiming to be "anointed" who are selected to assist the Governing Body.
