= Nehemiah 10 =

Chapter in the Old Testament Book of Nehemiah

- ← chapter 9 chapter 11 →
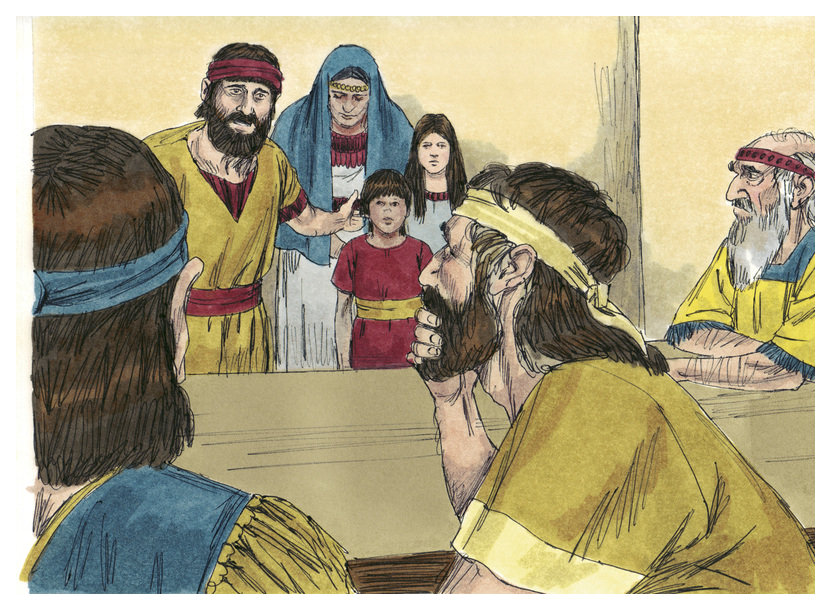
- Discussing the issue of intermarriage. Illustration of Book of Ezra/Nehemiah. Biblical illustrations by Jim Padgett
- Book: Book of Nehemiah
- Category: Ketuvim
- Christian Bible part: Old Testament
- Order in the Christian part: 16

Nehemiah 10 is the tenth chapter of the Book of Nehemiah in the Old Testament of the Christian Bible, or the 20th chapter of the book of Ezra-Nehemiah in the Hebrew Bible, which treats the book of Ezra and the book of Nehemiah as one book. Jewish tradition states that Ezra is the author of Ezra-Nehemiah as well as the Books of Chronicles, but modern scholars generally accept that a compiler from the 5th century BCE known as the Chronicler is the final author of these books. The chapter contains the list of signatories to the people's pledge and the later part deals with intermarriage with the non-Jews among the "people of the land" (parallel to Ezra 10) punctuated with the pledge to separate from "foreigners".

== Text ==
The original text of this chapter is in Hebrew language. In English Bible texts this chapter is divided into 39 verses, but 40 verses in Hebrew Bible, due to a different verse numbering as follows:

English texts	Hebrew texts
9:38	10:1
10:1–39	10:2–40

This article generally follows the common numbering in Christian English Bible versions, with notes to the numbering in Hebrew Bible versions.

=== Textual witnesses ===
Some early manuscripts containing the text of this chapter in Hebrew are of the Masoretic Text, which includes Codex Leningradensis (1008). (Note: Since the anti-Jewish riots in Aleppo in 1947, the whole book of Ezra-Nehemiah has been missing from the text of the Aleppo Codex.)

There is also a translation into Koine Greek known as the Septuagint, made in the last few centuries BCE. Extant ancient manuscripts of the Septuagint version include Codex Vaticanus (B; $\mathfrak{G}$^{B}; 4th century), Codex Sinaiticus (S; BHK: $\mathfrak{G}$^{S}; 4th century), and Codex Alexandrinus (A; $\mathfrak{G}$^{A}; 5th century).

== The leaders set their seal to the pledge (10:1–27) ==
After the first seal from Nehemiah the governor (verse 1a), the record is carefully ordered with three lists of signatories: the priests (10:1b–8), the Levites (10:9–13) and the chiefs of the people (10:14–27). Ezra the priest, who has played a leading part in the narrative on chapters 8 and 9, is not mentioned in this chapter.

=== Verse 1 ===
Now those who placed their seal on the document were:

Nehemiah the governor, the son of Hacaliah, and
Zedekiah,

- "Governor": Hebrew: Tirshatha. Nehemiah was the governor of Yehud Medinata, or the province of Judah, within the Persian Achaemenid Empire.

=== Verse 3 ===
Pashhur, Amariah, Malchijah,

- "Malchijah": the name of the fifth of "24 Priestly Divisions" in 1 Chronicles 24. This name appears in a stone inscription that was found in 1970 on a partially buried column in a mosque, in the Yemeni village of Bayt al-Ḥaḍir, among the ten names of priestly wards and their respective towns and villages. This "Yemeni inscription" is the longest roster of names of this sort ever discovered, unto this day. The names legible on the stone column discovered by Walter W. Müller.

=== Verse 5 ===
Harim, Meremoth, Obadiah,

- "Harim": the name of the third of "24 Priestly Divisions" in 1 Chronicles 24 (cf. Nehemiah 12:15, possibly "Rehum" in Nehemiah 12:3). One fragment of Dead Sea Scrolls (4Q325; "Mishmarot D") mentions:

The beginning of the se[cond] month is [on the si]xth [day] of the course of Jedaiah. On the second of the month is the Sabbath of the course of Harim....

=== Verse 7 ===
Meshullam, Abijah, Mijamin,

- "Abijah": the name of the eighth of "24 Priestly Divisions" in 1 Chronicles 24 (cf. Nehemiah 12:4, 17). Zechariah, the father of John the Baptist, was a member of this division (Luke 1:5; also spelled as "Abia"). This name appears in the "Yemeni inscription", found in 1970 in the Yemeni village of Bayt al-Ḥaḍir, among the ten names of priestly wards and their respective towns and villages (cf. verse 3 "Malchijah").
- "Mijamin": from Hebrew מִיָּמִ֖ן; the name of the sixth of "24 Priestly Divisions" in 1 Chronicles 24 (spelled as מִיָּמִ֥ין in Nehemiah 12:4). This name appears in the "Yemeni inscription", found in 1970 in the Yemeni village of Bayt al-Ḥaḍir, among the ten names of priestly wards and their respective towns and villages (cf. verse 3 "Malchijah"). It is spelled as "Minjamin" (מִ֨נְיָמִ֔ין) in Nehemiah 12:17.

=== Verse 8 ===
Maaziah, Bilgai, Shemaiah: these were the priests.

- "Maaziah": The name of the twenty-fourth of "24 Priestly Divisions" in 1 Chronicles 24 (probably "Maadiah" in Nehemiah 12:5).
- "Bilgai": spelled as "Bilgah" in Nehemiah 12:5; the name of the fifteenth of "24 Priestly Divisions" in 1 Chronicles 24.

== Stipulations of the pledge (10:28–39) ==
The pledge contains the general affirmation involving the whole community (verses 28–29; cf. Ezra 9–10) and particular obligations 'which they lay upon themselves' (verses 30–39), in relation to intermarriage (verse 30), to the Sabbath and sabbatical year (verse 31), and to the provision for the upkeep of the Temple and clergy (verses 32–39). The wording can be traced to the Book of Deuteronomy, such as "to walk in God's law" (cf. Deuteronomy 8:6) and "to observe and do all the commandments" (cf. Deuteronomy 28:15).

=== Verse 29 ===
These joined with their brethren, their nobles, and entered into a curse and an oath to walk in God's Law, which was given by Moses the servant of God, and to observe and do all the commandments of the Lord our Lord, and His ordinances and His statutes.

The "curse" is the penalty which they invoked if they were faithless to the covenant, the "oath" is the solemn obligation of a duty which they vowed to perform: the oath recalls the wording of Deuteronomy 29:12, enter into covenant with the Lord your God, and into His oath, which the Lord your God makes with you today.

=== Verse 32 ===
Also we made ordinances for us, to charge ourselves yearly with the third part of a shekel for the service of the house of our God;

- "Made ordinances for us": Hebrew "cause to stand on us," NET Bible: "accept responsibility for fulfilling the commands".
- "To charge ourselves": Hebrew MT reads "to give upon us", but the term עָלֵינוּ (ʿalenu, "upon us") is not found in a few medieval Hebrew mss, the Syriac Peshitta, and the Vulgate; NET Bible: "to give".
- "Shekel": was about 2/5 ounce or 11 grams.
- "House" (as in Hebrew): refers to the "temple" (also in verses 33, 34, 35, 36, 37, 38, 39).

== See also ==
- Jerusalem
- Tithe
- Related Bible parts: Deuteronomy 28, Ezra 9, Ezra 10

== Sources ==
- Fensham, F. Charles (1982). The Books of Ezra and Nehemiah. New international commentary on the Old Testament (illustrated ed.). Wm. B. Eerdmans Publishing. ISBN 978-0-8028-2527-8.
- Grabbe, Lester L. (2003). "Nehemiah". In Dunn, James D. G.; Rogerson, John William (eds.). Eerdmans Commentary on the Bible (illustrated ed.). Wm. B. Eerdmans Publishing. pp. 320–328. ISBN 978-0-8028-3711-0.
- Halley, Henry H. (1965). Halley's Bible Handbook: an abbreviated Bible commentary (24th (revised) ed.). Zondervan Publishing House. ISBN 0-310-25720-4.
- Larson, Knute; Dahlen, Kathy; Anders, Max E. (2005). Anders, Max E. (ed.). Holman Old Testament Commentary - Ezra, Nehemiah, Esther. Vol. 9 (illustrated ed.). B&H Publishing Group. ISBN 978-0-8054-9469-3.
- Levering, Matthew (2007). Ezra & Nehemiah. Brazos Theological Commentary on the Bible. Brazos Press. ISBN 978-1-58743-161-6.
- McConville, J. G. (1985). Ezra, Nehemiah, and Esther. The daily study Bible : Old Testament. Westminster John Knox Press. ISBN 978-0-664-24583-2.
- Smith-Christopher, Daniel L. (2007). "15. Ezra-Nehemiah". In Barton, John; Muddiman, John (eds.). The Oxford Bible Commentary (first (paperback) ed.). Oxford University Press. pp. 308–324. ISBN 978-0-19-927718-6.
- Throntveit, Mark A. (1992). Ezra-Nehemiah. John Knox Press. ISBN 978-0-664-23744-8.
- Wise, Michael; Abegg, Martin Jr.; Cook, Edward (1996). The Dead Sea Scrolls: A New Translation. San Francisco: Harper. pp. 296–323. ISBN 0-06-069201-4.
- Würthwein, Ernst (1995). The Text of the Old Testament. Translated by Rhodes, Erroll F. Grand Rapids, MI: Wm. B. Eerdmans. ISBN 0-8028-0788-7.
