= Nehemiah 3 =

Chapter from Nehemiah in the Old Testament

- ← chapter 2 chapter 4 →
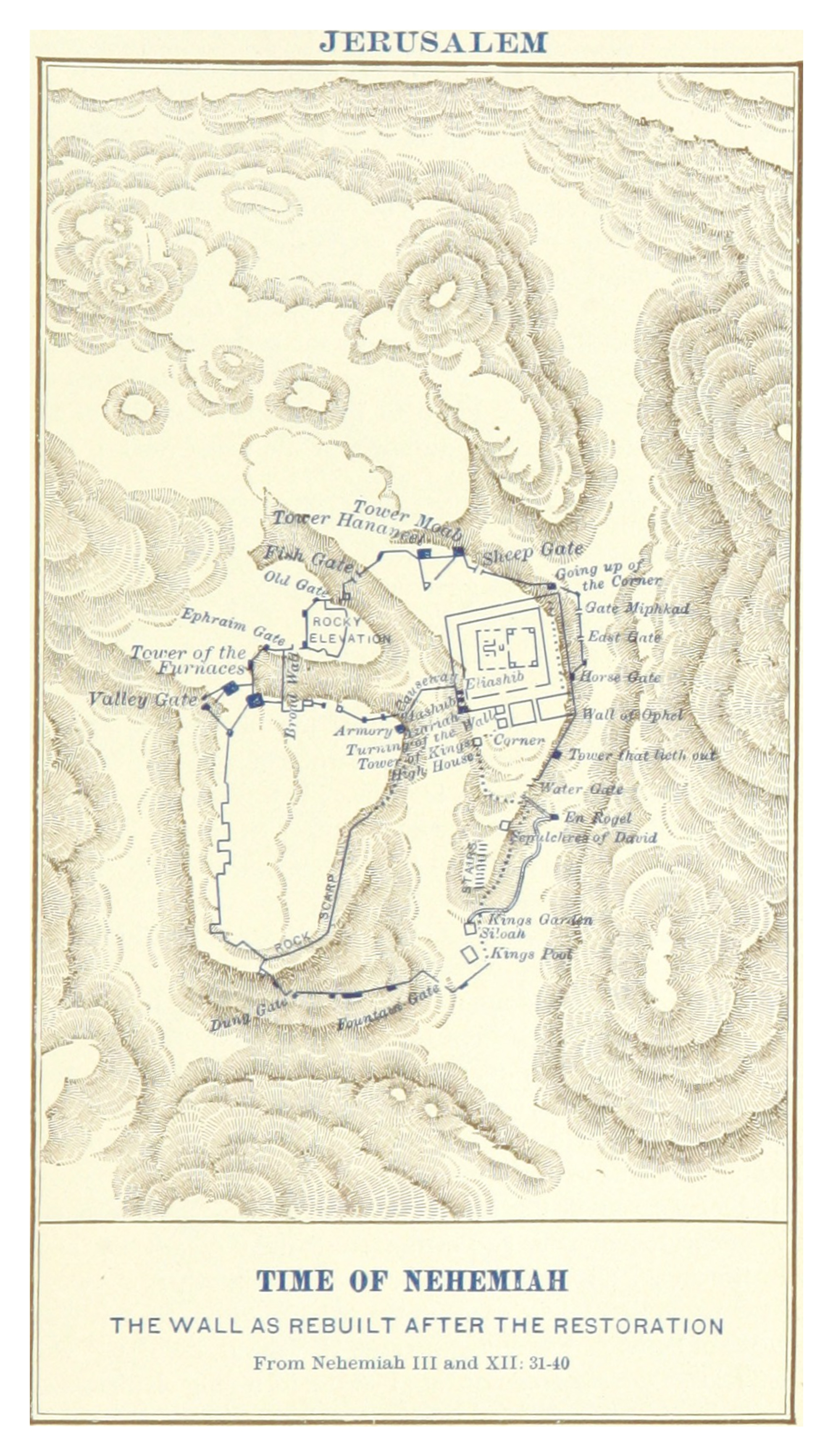
- Map of Jerusalem in the time of Nehemiah. Page 133 of The Holy Land in Geography and in History. 1899. British Library HMNTS 010077.f.24.
- Book: Book of Nehemiah
- Category: Ketuvim
- Christian Bible part: Old Testament
- Order in the Christian part: 16

Nehemiah 3 is the third chapter of the Book of Nehemiah in the Old Testament of the Christian Bible, or the 13th chapter of the book of Ezra-Nehemiah in the Hebrew Bible, which treats the book of Ezra and the book of Nehemiah as one book. Jewish tradition states that Ezra is the author of Ezra-Nehemiah as well as the Book of Chronicles, but modern scholars generally accept that a compiler from the 5th century BCE (the so-called "Chronicler") is the final author of these books. This chapter records in detail the rebuilding of the walls and gates of Jerusalem, starting from the north to west sections (verses 1–15), continued to south and east sections until reaching the Sheep Gate again, the initial starting point (verses 16–32).

== Text ==
This chapter is divided into 32 verses. The original text of this chapter is in Hebrew language.

=== Textual witnesses ===
Some early manuscripts containing the text of this chapter in Hebrew are of the Masoretic Text, which includes Codex Leningradensis (1008). (Note: Since 1947 the whole book of Ezra-Nehemiah has been missing from the text of the Aleppo Codex.)

There is also a translation into Koine Greek known as the Septuagint, made in the last few centuries BCE. Extant ancient manuscripts of the Septuagint version include Codex Vaticanus (B; $\mathfrak{G}$^{B}; 4th century), Codex Sinaiticus (S; BHK: $\mathfrak{G}$^{S}; 4th century), and Codex Alexandrinus (A; $\mathfrak{G}$^{A}; 5th century).

== The northern wall (3:1-5) ==
Nehemiah led the building of Jerusalem's walls. In "Standard Bible Story Readers" by. Lillie A. Faris 1925.

In this section, Nehemiah lists the process of rebuilding the wall of Jerusalem, starting with the people working on the north wall and its gates. The north side of wall would have suffered 'the brunt of most attacks on Jerusalem, for those arriving from Mesopotamia' (cf. Jeremiah 1:13–15).

=== Verse 1 ===
Then Eliashib the high priest rose up with his brethren the priests, and they builded the sheep gate; they sanctified it, and set up the doors of it; even unto the tower of Meah they sanctified it, unto the tower of Hananeel.

- "Eliashib the high priest": Eliashib was the son of Joiakim, and the grandson of Jeshua the high priest (Ezra 3:2; Nehemiah 12:10). Nehemiah begins with the work of Eliashib the high priest and his fellow priests to symbolize 'the holy and noble task' in which everyone was engaged.
- "The sheep gate": also mentioned in Nehemiah 3:32 and Nehemiah 12:39; could be the same gate as mentioned in John 5:2, Now there is in Jerusalem by the sheep gate a pool, which is called in Hebrew Bethesda. The fact that the priests restored it indicates its proximity to the Temple which is confirmed by the reference to it in Nehemiah 12:39. Its position in the northeast portion of Jerusalem gives identification to the modern "St. Stephen's gate."
- "The tower of Meah": Hebrew: Hammeah or "the Tower of the Hundred".
- "The tower of Hananeel": a well-known landmark, which is mentioned also in Nehemiah 12:39; Jeremiah 31:38; Zechariah 14:10, standing midway between "the sheep gate" and "the fish gate", at the northeast corner of Jerusalem, then from this point, the wall which had run northwestern from the sheep gate now turned to west.

=== Verse 3 ===
Also the sons of Hassenaah built the Fish Gate; they laid its beams and hung its doors with its bolts and bars.

The workers on the Fish Gate 'built' rather than 'repaired' the wall.

=== Verse 4 ===
And next to them Meremoth the son of Uriah, son of Hakkoz repaired. And next to them Meshullam the son of Berechiah, son of Meshezabel repaired. And next to them Zadok the son of Baana repaired.

- "Hakkoz": the name of the seventh of "24 Priestly Divisions" in 1 Chronicles 24 (cf. Ezra 2:61; Nehemiah 3:21). This name appears in a stone inscription that was found in 1970 on a partially buried column in a mosque, in the Yemeni village of Bayt al-Ḥaḍir, among the ten names of priestly wards and their respective towns and villages. This "Yemeni inscription" is the longest roster of names of this sort ever discovered, unto this day. The names legible on the stone column discovered by Walter W. Müller.

== The western wall (3:6-14) ==
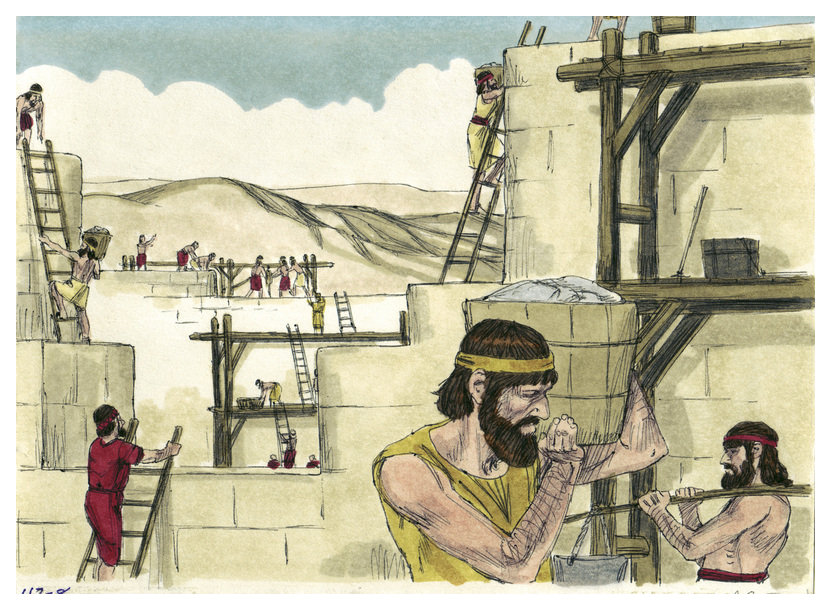
The building of Jerusalem wall. Illustration of Book of Nehemiah Chapter 3. Biblical illustrations by Jim Padgett

The rebuilding process of the wall around Jerusalem, as reported in sections, actually happened simultaneously. While the priests worked on the north wall, others built along the western extension.

=== Verse 12 ===
And next unto him repaired Shallum the son of Halohesh, the ruler of the half part of Jerusalem, he and his daughters.

- "The half part of Jerusalem" (or "half the district of Jerusalem"): is the 'Zion' half of the city.
- "And his daughters": the peculiarity of mentioning "daughters" has led some to consider this word a technical term for 'villages' and 'country towns' (cf. Nehemiah 11:25; Nehemiah 11:27) adjacent to that quarter of Jerusalem, but the most simple and literal explanation (and probably the best) is that the restoration of the walls involved many individuals, including women.

== The eastern wall (3:15-32) ==
The last section describes the building the east wall, which needed more workers, 'probably because it was more extensively damaged'. Twenty-one work details were reported on this side of the wall.

=== Verse 15 ===
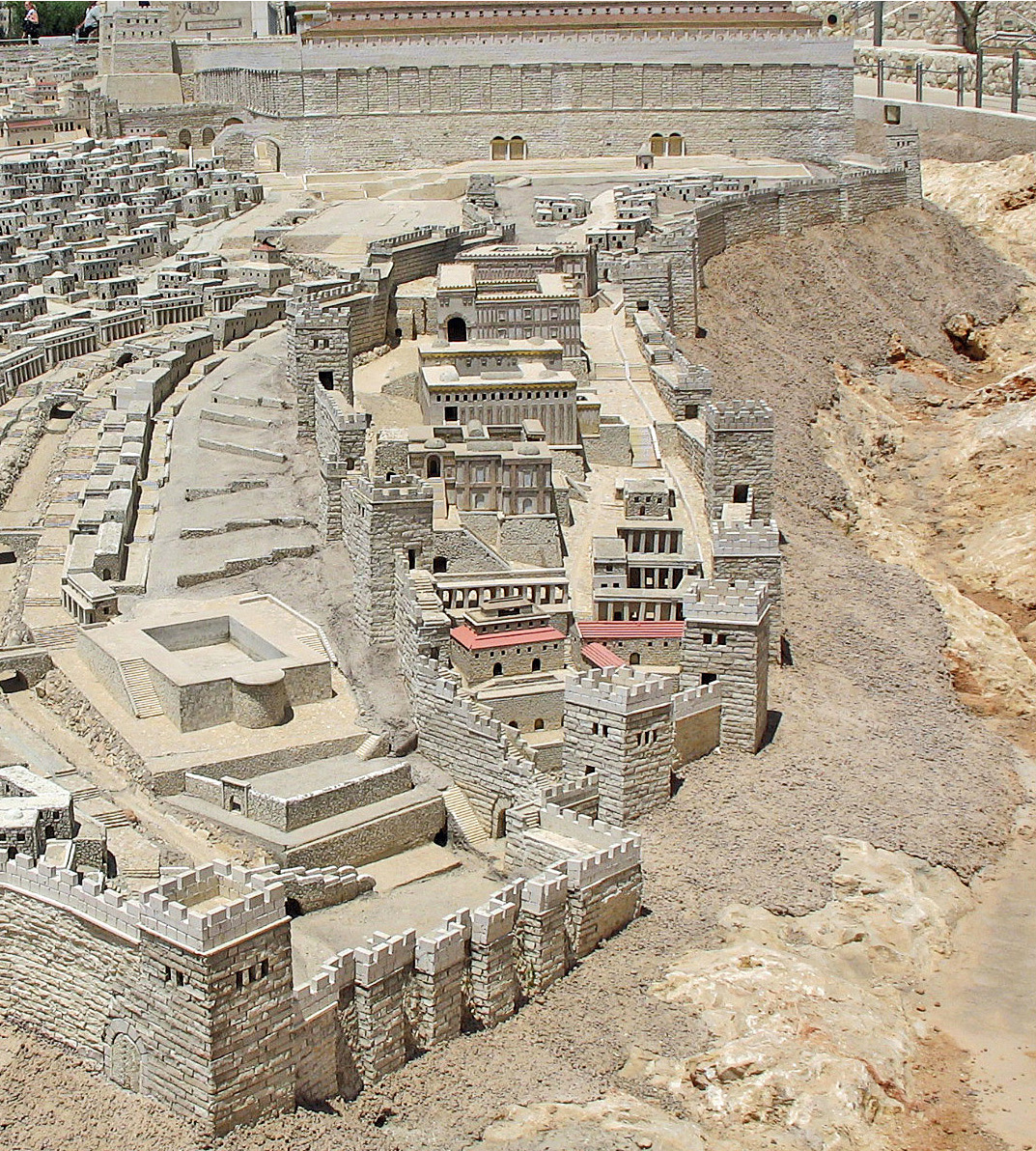
Model of historical City of David in the Israel Museum

But the gate of the fountain repaired Shallun the son of Colhozeh, the ruler of part of Mizpah; he built it, and covered it, and set up the doors thereof, the locks thereof, and the bars thereof, and the wall of the pool of Siloah by the king's garden, and unto the stairs that go down from the city of David.

- "Siloah": translated from the Hebrew word הַשֶּׁלַחhashelakh ("water-channel"; cf. ASV, NASB, NRSV, TEV, CEV “Shelah”); apparently refers to the Pool of Siloam whose water supply came from the Gihon Spring via Hezekiah's Tunnel built in 701 BCE (cf. Isaiah 8:6).

=== Verse 21 ===
After him Meremoth the son of Uriah, son of Hakkoz repaired another section from the door of the house of Eliashib to the end of the house of Eliashib.

- "Hakkoz": the name of the seventh of "24 Priestly Divisions" in 1 Chronicles 24 (cf. Ezra 2:61; Nehemiah 3:4). This name appears in the "Yemeni inscription", found in 1970 in the Yemeni village of Bayt al-Ḥaḍir, among the ten names of priestly wards and their respective towns and villages (cf. verse 4 "Hakkoz").

=== Verse 32 ===
And between the going up of the corner unto the sheep gate repaired the goldsmiths and the merchants.

- "The sheep gate": was the starting place of the wall rebuilding account (Nehemiah 3:1).
- "The goldsmiths and the merchants": represented communities that 'largely and closely interested in the transactions connected with Temple offerings', indicated by the mention of their working in proximity to repair the wall. The "goldsmiths" generally work on 'the supply and repair of vessels, furniture, and dress, required for the daily ministration, the dedication of precious things related to the Temple', whereas the "merchants" would establish stations at the main approaches to the Temple complex to provide supplies for 'the worshippers and sacrificers' visiting the Temple.

== See also ==
- Jerusalem
- Walls of Jerusalem
- Related Bible parts: Ezra 2, Ezra 3, Nehemiah 2, John 5

== Sources ==
- Fensham, F. Charles (1982). The Books of Ezra and Nehemiah. New international commentary on the Old Testament (illustrated ed.). Wm. B. Eerdmans Publishing. ISBN 978-0802825278.
- Grabbe, Lester L. (2003). "Nehemiah". In Dunn, James D. G.; Rogerson, John William (eds.). Eerdmans Commentary on the Bible (illustrated ed.). Wm. B. Eerdmans Publishing. pp. 320–328. ISBN 978-0802837110.
- Halley, Henry H. (1965). Halley's Bible Handbook: an abbreviated Bible commentary (24th (revised) ed.). Zondervan Publishing House. ISBN 0-310-25720-4.
- Larson, Knute; Dahlen, Kathy; Anders, Max E. (2005). Anders, Max E. (ed.). Holman Old Testament Commentary - Ezra, Nehemiah, Esther. Vol. 9 (illustrated ed.). B&H Publishing Group. ISBN 978-0805494693.
- Levering, Matthew (2007). Ezra & Nehemiah. Brazos Theological Commentary on the Bible. Brazos Press. ISBN 978-1587431616.
- McConville, J. G. (1985). Ezra, Nehemiah, and Esther. The daily study Bible : Old Testament. Westminster John Knox Press. ISBN 978-0664245832.
- Smith-Christopher, Daniel L. (2007). "15. Ezra-Nehemiah". In Barton, John; Muddiman, John (eds.). The Oxford Bible Commentary (first (paperback) ed.). Oxford University Press. pp. 308–324. ISBN 978-0199277186.
- Würthwein, Ernst (1995). The Text of the Old Testament. Translated by Rhodes, Erroll F. Grand Rapids, MI: Wm. B. Eerdmans. ISBN 0-8028-0788-7.
