= Hananeel (tower) =

Tower in Jerusalem mentioned in the Bible

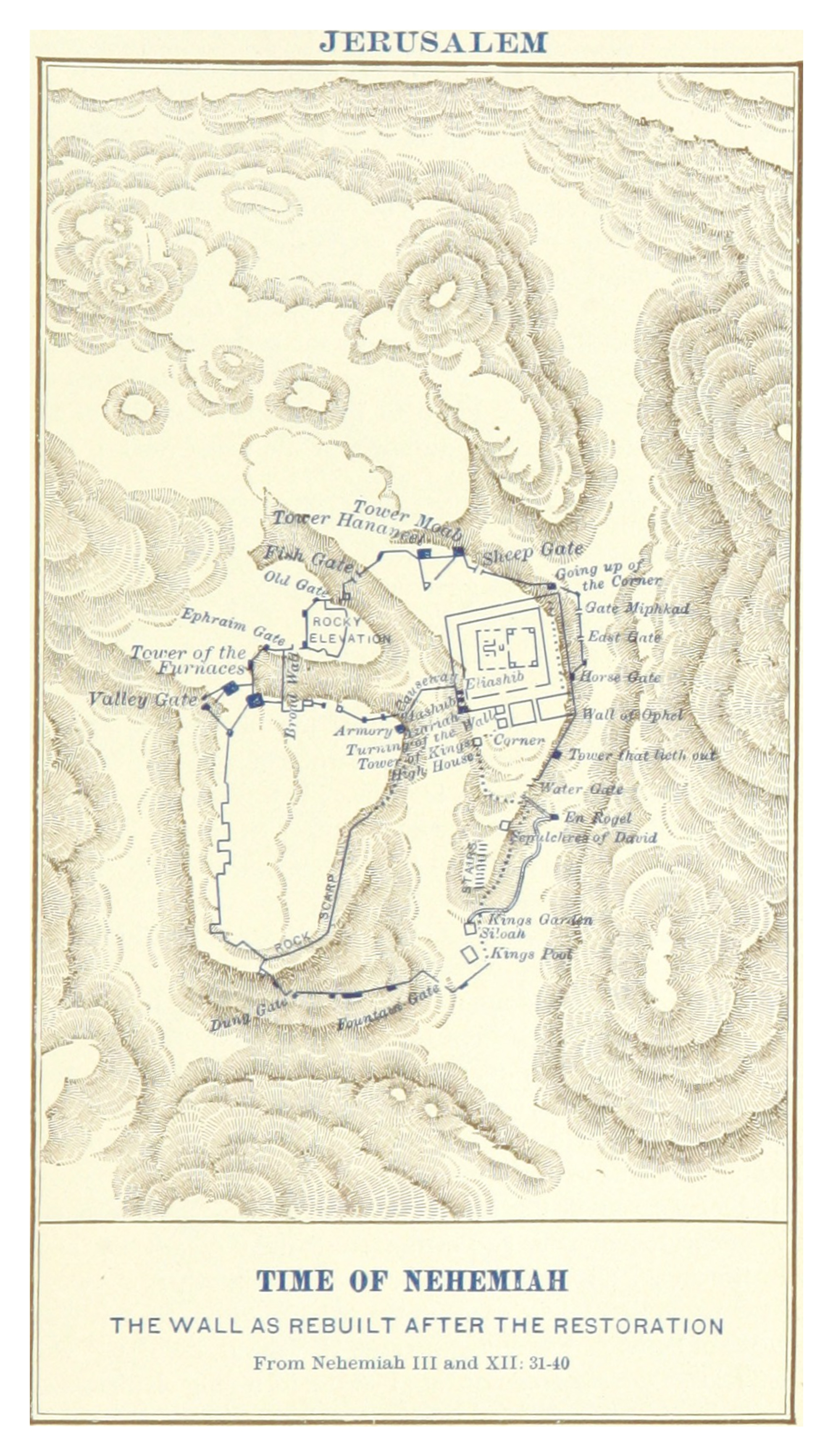
The Tower of Hananeel (at the northern wall) in the Map of Jerusalem during the time of Nehemiah. Page 133 of The Holy Land in Geography and in History. 1899. British Library HMNTS 010077.f.24.

The Tower of Hananeel (or Hananel; חננאל hanan'e-el, chanan'-el, "El (God) is gracious") is a tower in the walls of Jerusalem, adjoining the Tower of Meah (or Hammeah: "the Tower of the Hundred") to the east connecting to the "sheep gate". It is mentioned in Jeremiah 31:38 and in Nehemiah 3:1 and Nehemiah 12:39. It is located on the northern wall section of the old city, near the northeastern corner, a point of the city always requiring special fortification and later the sites successively of the Hasmonean Baris and of the Antonia Fortress.

== Biblical accounts ==
The prophet Jeremiah foretold the rebuilding of Jerusalem:

Behold, the days come, saith the LORD, that the city shall be built to the LORD from the tower of Hananeel unto the gate of the corner.

— Jeremiah 31:38

About 150 years later, the walls of Jerusalem were built again under Nehemiah:

Then Eliashib the high priest rose up with his brethren the priests, and they builded the sheep gate; they sanctified it, and set up the doors of it; even unto the tower of Meah they sanctified it, unto the tower of Hananeel.

— Nehemiah 3:1

As soon as the walls were ready they had a dedication feast with gladness, both with thanksgivings, and with singing, cymbals, psalteries, and with harps.

And from above the gate of Ephraim, and above the old gate, and above the fish gate, and the tower of Hananeel, and the tower of Meah, even unto the sheep gate: and they stood still in the prison gate.

— Nehemiah 12:39

Zechariah placed this tower as the northern point of Jerusalem in the rebuilding.

All the land shall be turned as a plain from Geba to Rimmon south of Jerusalem: and it shall be lifted up, and inhabited in her place, from Benjamin's gate unto the place of the first gate, unto the corner gate, and [from] the tower of Hananeel unto the king's winepresses.

— Zechariah 14:10

== Analysis ==
Based on the description in Nehemiah 3, the tower of Hananeel stood midway between "the sheep gate" and "the fish gate", at the northeast corner of Jerusalem, then from this point, the wall of the city which had run northwestern from the sheep gate now turned to west.

As "Hananeel" (or "Hananel") means "God's grace", Schroeder notes that the Tower of Hananeel “metaphorically designates” the apostles and first believers who were "strengthened like a tower by the grace of the Holy Spirit descending on them on the Day of Pentecost with a visible sign" (Acts 2:3).
