= Bayt ʽUqab =

Bayt ʽUqab بيت عقب
- Village
- Location in Yemen
- Coordinates: 15.35114°N 44.38169°E
- Country: Yemen
- Governorate: Sanaa
- District: Sanhan
- Elevation: 8,271 ft (2,521 m)
- Time zone: UTC+3 (Yemen Standard Time)

Bayt ʽUqab (Arabic: بيت عقب Bayt ʽUqab) is a village in Sanhan District of Sanaa Governorate, Yemen.

== History ==
Bayt ʽUqab first appears in historical sources in the year 903 (290 AH). In April or May of that year, the Al Tarif general Ibrahim ibn Khalaf camped at Bayt ʽUqab during a campaign against al-Hadi ila'l-Haqq Yahya, the first Imam of Yemen. The two armies fought a battle at Bayt Hadir, 5 km west-southwest of Bayt ʽUqab; the Al Tarif were defeated and had to retreat.
