= Ezra 2 =

Chapter in the Book of Ezra

- ← chapter 1 chapter 3 →
- The book of Ezra (Masoretic Text with Tiberian vocalization and notes). From Yemen, circa 1480.
- Book: Book of Ezra
- Category: Ketuvim
- Christian Bible part: Old Testament
- Order in the Christian part: 15

Ezra 2 is the second chapter of the Book of Ezra in the Old Testament of the Christian Bible, or the book of Ezra–Nehemiah in the Hebrew Bible, which treats the book of Ezra and book of Nehemiah as one book. Jewish tradition states that Ezra is the author of Ezra–Nehemiah as well as the Book of Chronicles, but modern scholars generally accept that a compiler from the 5th century BCE (the so-called "Chronicler") is the final author of these books. The section comprising chapter 1 to 6 describes the history before the arrival of Ezra in the land of Judah in 468 BCE. This chapter contains a list, known as the "Golah List", of the people who returned from Babylon to Judah following Cyrus's edict "by genealogy, family and place of habitation".

== Text ==
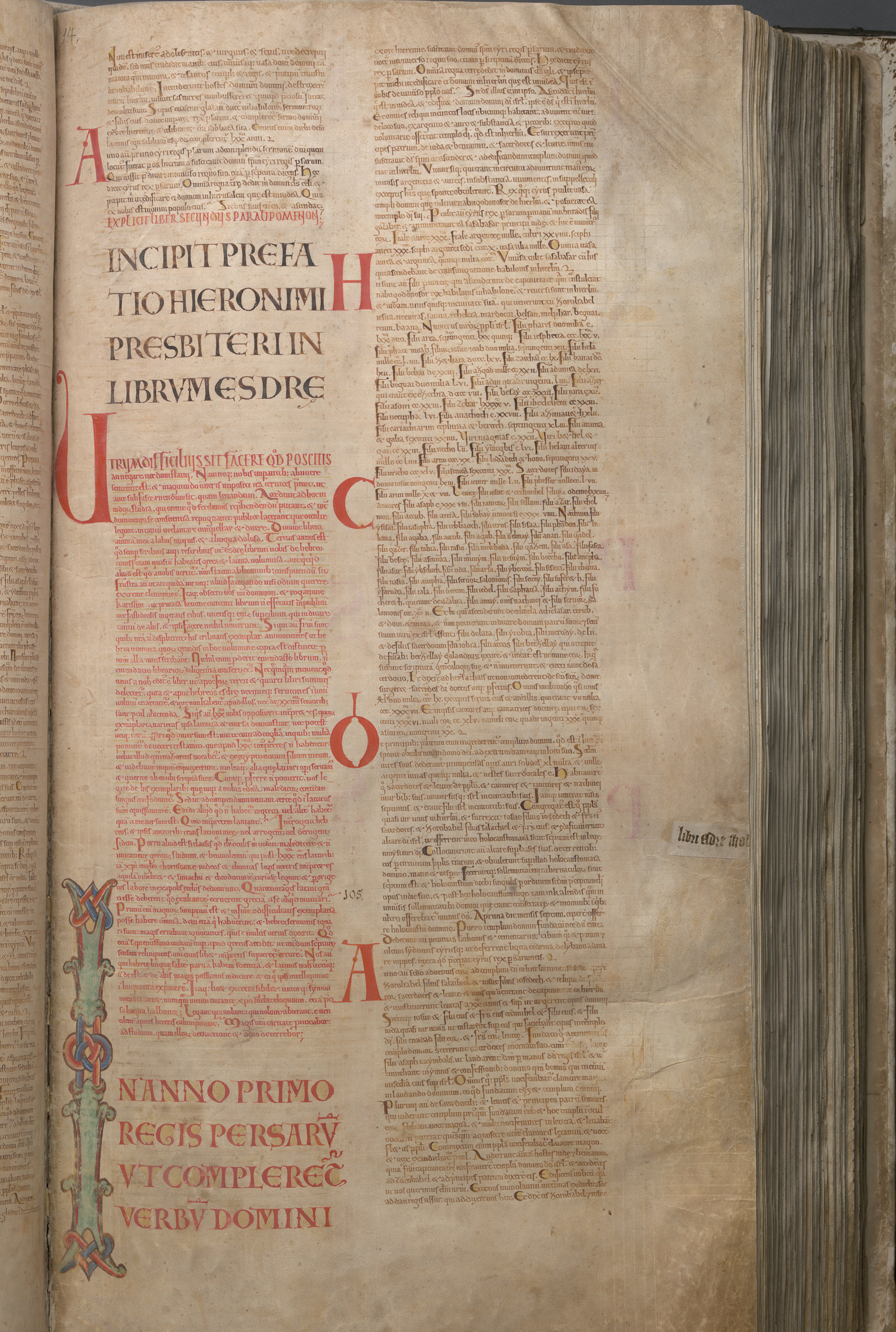
A page containing the Latin text of 2 Chronicles (ending part) and Ezra 1:1–4:3 in the Codex Gigas (English: Giant Book), the largest extant medieval manuscript in the world (from 13th century).

The original text is written in Hebrew language. This chapter is divided into 70 verses.

=== Textual witnesses ===
Some early manuscripts containing the text of this chapter in Hebrew are of the Masoretic Text, which includes Codex Leningradensis (1008). (Note: Since the anti-Jewish riots in Aleppo in 1947, the whole book of Ezra–Nehemiah has been missing from the text of the Aleppo Codex.)

There is also a translation into Koine Greek known as the Septuagint, made in the last few centuries BCE. Extant ancient manuscripts of the Septuagint version include Codex Vaticanus (B; $\mathfrak{G}$^{B}; 4th century), and Codex Alexandrinus (A; $\mathfrak{G}$^{A}; 5th century). (Note: The extant Codex Sinaiticus only contains Ezra 9:9–10:44.)

An ancient Greek book called 1 Esdras (Greek: Ἔσδρας Αʹ) containing parts of 2 Chronicles, Ezra and Nehemiah is included in most editions of the Septuagint and is placed before the single book of Ezra–Nehemiah, which is titled in Greek "Ἔσδρας Βʹ". 1 Esdras 5:7–46 is the equivalent of Ezra 2, listing the former exiles who returned to Jerusalem.

== The community (verses 1–63) ==
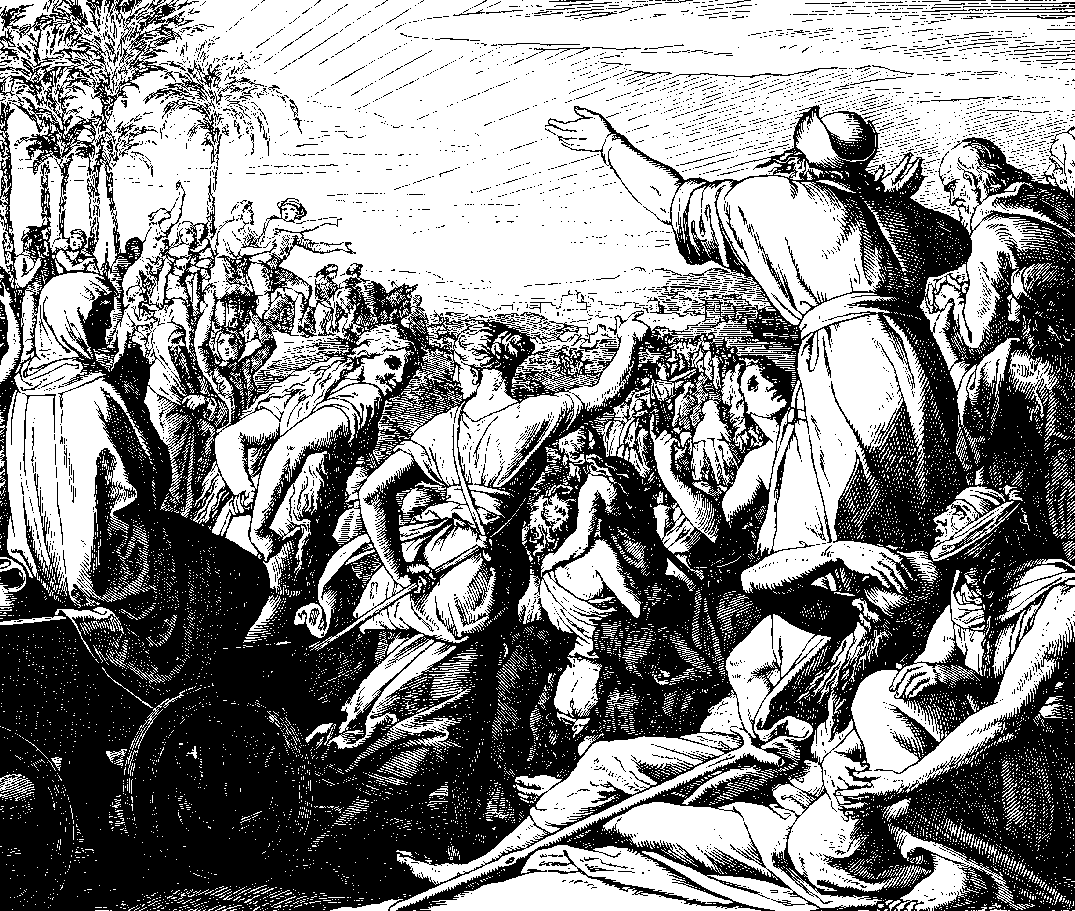
The return from exile is depicted in this woodcut for Die Bibel in Bildern, 1860, by Julius Schnorr von Carolsfeld.

The list here is not an account the people who were recently back from the journey, but those who have arrived and settled down after returning from Babylon, where they currently reside in Palestine among the other inhabitants of the land – non-Jews and also the Jews who never left the land, "whom the Babylonians has left behind as undesirable". The genealogies apparently "function as authenticators of who has a right to be classified as an Israelite", because "those who could not prove their genealogy were excluded" (verses 59–63).

=== Verse 1 ===
Now these are the children of the province, who went up out of the captivity of those who had been carried away, whom Nebuchadnezzar the king of Babylon had carried away to Babylon, and who returned to Jerusalem and Judah, everyone to his city;

- "The province" refers to the "Persian province of Yehuda Medinata (Judah)".
- "Of those who had been carried away" is translated from Hebrew: הגולה, ha-gōlāh, the "Gola" ("Golah") or "the exiles".

=== Verse 2 ===
Those who came with Zerubbabel were Jeshua, Nehemiah, Seraiah, Reelaiah, Mordecai, Bilshan, Mispar, Bigvai, Rehum, and Baanah.
The number of the men of the people of Israel:

Zerubbabel is the leader of the group, and of the Davidic line (see 1 Chronicles 3:19). He is associated with the messianic hope in the Book of Zechariah, although nothing of this is mentioned in Ezra.

Some names are written differently in the Book of Nehemiah:

Ezra 2:2	Nehemiah 7:7
Seraiah	Azariah
Reelaiah	Raamiah
Mispar	Mispereth
Rehum	Nehum

The Jerusalem Bible names a further returnee, Nahamani, and notes that there are twelve returnees as listed there, indicative of the number of the tribes of Israel. Generally, other versions list only 11 names. Nahamani is included among the returnees listed in Nehemiah 7:7.

"Men of the people of Israel": The list makes the point that only those of the Gola (="the exiles") 'properly constituted "Israel"'.

=== Verse 16 ===
[T]he sons of Ater of Hezekiah—ninety-eight;

- "Of Hezekiah": in Hebrew can also mean "[born] to Hezekiah", that is "through Hezekiah", or "through the family/house of Hezekiah" (cf. Ezra 2:36 in the NET Bible), or "through the line of Hezekiah" (cf. Ezra 2:40 in the NET Bible).

=== Verse 61 ===
Also, of the sons of the priests: the sons of Habaiah, the sons of Hakkoz, and the sons of Barzillai (who had taken a wife from the daughters of Barzillai the Gileadite, and was called by their name).

- "Hakkoz": the name of the seventh of "24 Priestly Divisions" in 1 Chronicles 24 (cf. Nehemiah 3:4, 21). This name appears in a stone inscription that was found in 1970 on a partially buried column in a mosque, in the Yemeni village of Bayt al-Ḥaḍir, among the ten names of priestly wards and their respective towns and villages. This "Yemeni inscription" is the longest roster of names of this sort ever discovered, unto this day. The names are legible on the stone column discovered by Walter W. Müller.

== The totals (verses 64–67) ==
The number of the people here shows the depletion of the population; in time of Moses "the whole number of the people of Israel...from 20 years old and upward,... was 603,550" (Numbers 1:45–46) not counting the Levites, whereas in the time of David, "in Israel there were 800,000 valiant men who drew the sword, and the men of Judah were 500,000" (2 Samuel 24:9), but now the returned exiles, including the priests and Levites, only "amount to 42,360" (verse 64). The listing of servants and animals reflects "the status of the exiles, their resources and capabilities".

== Temple gifts (verses 68–69) ==
Those arrived back in Jerusalem and Judah gave freewill offerings "toward the rebuilding of the house of God".

== Resettlement (verses 70) ==
The conclusion of the list is similar to the beginning (verse 1): "by affirming the resettlement of the exiles", as every person has now settled "in their own towns".

== See also ==
- Jerusalem
- Jeshua
- Related Bible parts: Nehemiah 7, Haggai 2

== Sources ==
- Fensham, F. Charles (1982). The Books of Ezra and Nehemiah. New international commentary on the Old Testament (illustrated ed.). Wm. B. Eerdmans Publishing. ISBN 978-0802825278.
- Grabbe, Lester L. (2003). "Ezra". In Dunn, James D. G.; Rogerson, John William (eds.). Eerdmans Commentary on the Bible (illustrated ed.). Wm. B. Eerdmans Publishing. pp. 313–319. ISBN 978-0802837110.
- Halley, Henry H. (1965). Halley's Bible Handbook: an abbreviated Bible commentary (24th (revised) ed.). Zondervan Publishing House. ISBN 0-310-25720-4.
- Larson, Knute; Dahlen, Kathy; Anders, Max E. (2005). Anders, Max E. (ed.). Holman Old Testament Commentary - Ezra, Nehemiah, Esther. Vol. 9 (illustrated ed.). B&H Publishing Group. ISBN 978-0805494693.
- Levering, Matthew (2007). Ezra & Nehemiah. Brazos Theological Commentary on the Bible. Brazos Press. ISBN 978-1587431616.
- McConville, J. G. (1985). Ezra, Nehemiah, and Esther. The daily study Bible : Old Testament. Westminster John Knox Press. ISBN 978-0664245832.
- Smith-Christopher, Daniel L. (2007). "15. Ezra-Nehemiah". In Barton, John; Muddiman, John (eds.). The Oxford Bible Commentary (first (paperback) ed.). Oxford University Press. pp. 308–324. ISBN 978-0199277186.
- Würthwein, Ernst (1995). The Text of the Old Testament. Translated by Rhodes, Erroll F. Grand Rapids, MI: Wm. B. Eerdmans. ISBN 0-8028-0788-7.
