= Seorim =

Seorim was a priest of ancient Israel after the order of Aaron, during the reign of King David in the 10th century BCE. Seorim lead the fourth of the 24 priestly divisions. The biblical passage of 1 Chronicles 24 documents the division of the priests during the reign of King David. These priests were all descendants of Aaron, who had four sons: Nadab, Abihu, Eleazar and Ithamar. However, Nadab and Abihu died before Aaron and only Eleazar and Ithamar had sons. One priest, Zadok, from Eleazar's descendants and another priest, Ahimelech, from Ithamar's descendants were designated to help create the various priestly orders. Sixteen of Eleazar's descendants were selected to head priestly orders while only eight of Ithamar's descendants were so chosen. The passage states that this was done because of the greater number of leaders among Eleazar's descendants. Lots were drawn to designate the order of ministering for the heads of the priestly orders when they entered the temple. Since each order was responsible for ministering during a different week, Seorim's order was stationed as a watch at the Tabernacle during the fourth week of the year on the Hebrew calendar.

While Easton's Bible Dictionary translates Seorim as "barley", Hitchcock's Dictionary of Bible Names ascribes the meaning of "gates", "hairs", or "tempests" to the Hebrew name Seorim.

An R. Seorim is also mentioned in the Babylonian Talmud in the Ebel Rabbathi 3rd Chapter discussing pain at the time of death.
