= Jedaiah =

Priest of ancient Israel

Jedaiah was a priest of ancient Israel after the order of Aaron, during the reign of King David in the 10th century BCE. Jedaiah led the second of the 24 priestly divisions. The biblical passage of 1 Chronicles 24 documents the division of the priests during the reign of King David. These priests were all descendants of Aaron, who had four sons: Nadab, Abihu, Eleazar and Ithamar. However, Nadab and Abihu died before Aaron and only Eleazar and Ithamar had sons. One priest, Zadok, from Eleazar's descendants and another priest, Ahimelech, from Ithamar's descendants were designated to help create the various priestly orders. Sixteen of Eleazar's descendants were selected to head priestly orders while only eight of Ithamar's descendants were so chosen. The passage states that this was done because of the greater number of leaders among Eleazar's descendants. Lots were drawn to designate the order of ministering for the heads of the priestly orders when they entered the temple. Since each order was responsible for ministering during a different week, Jedaiah's order was stationed as a watch at the Tabernacle during the second week of the year on the Hebrew calendar.

The descendants of Jedaiah were regarded as one of the "families of Israel." Another priest named Jedaiah, presumably a descendant, is also named in a genealogy at 1 Chronicles 9:10. Jedaiah, son of Joiarib is mentioned in Nehemiah 11:10 among those who settled in Jerusalem and two priests named Jedaiah are listed in Nehemiah 12:6-7 among the priests who returned from the Babylonian exile. Nehemiah 3:10 mentions Jedaiah, son of Harumaph, as one who made repairs in the wall at Jerusalem near his own house.
