= Bayt Hadir =

Bayt Hadir بيت حاضر
- Village
- Location in Yemen
- Coordinates: 15.34475°N 44.33555°E
- Country: Yemen
- Governorate: Sanaa
- District: Bani Sanhan
- Elevation: 7,861 ft (2,396 m)
- Time zone: UTC+3 (Yemen Standard Time)

Bayt Hadir (Arabic: بيت حاضر Bayt Ḥāḍir) is a village in Sanhan District of Sanaa Governorate, Yemen. It is located 13 km east-southeast of Sanaa.

== History ==
Bayt Hadir was the site of a battle in April or May of 902 (290 AH), between al-Hadi ila'l-Haqq Yahya, the first Imam of Yemen, and the Yu'firid-aligned Al Tarif, led by Ibrahim ibn Khalaf. Al-Hadi had originally set up a camp at the village of Subul, but after he learned that Ibn Khalaf was encamped at nearby Bayt ʽUqab, he became concerned that his position was not secure, so he relocated to Bayt Hadir. The battle took place in two stages, with the Al Tarif defeated both times and forced to retreat. The Ghayat al-amani of Yahya ibn al-Husayn also describes another battle that took place at Bayt Hadir much later, in 1393 (795 AH). It is also the find site of an ancient Hebrew inscription.

== Archaeology ==
In 1970, an archaeological discovery was made in the village, consisting of a Hebrew inscription found on a partially buried stone column within a mosque. This inscription, considered significant, contains the names of Jewish priestly divisions who used to serve in the Temple in Jerusalem, along with their corresponding towns and villages in Galilee. The inscription is fragmentary, with only eleven names surviving out of the expected twenty-four. It stands as the longest known roster of such names found to date.
