= Ezra 3 =

Chapter in the Book of Ezra

- ← chapter 2 chapter 4 →
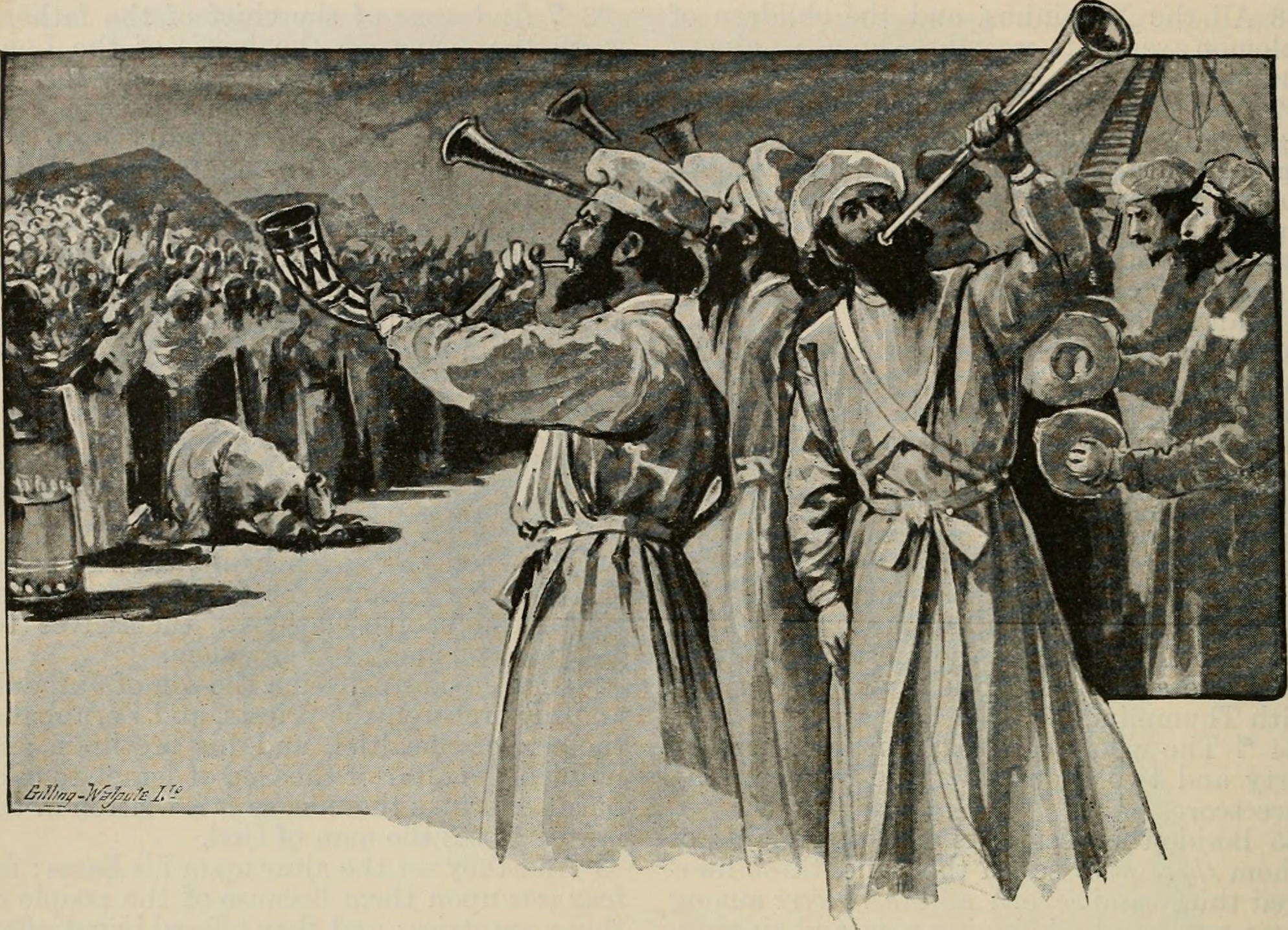
- "They set the priests in their apparel with trumpets ... to praise the Lord".—Ezra 3:10. In: The Art Bible, comprising the Old and New Testaments: with numerous illustrations (1896)
- Book: Book of Ezra
- Category: Ketuvim
- Christian Bible part: Old Testament
- Order in the Christian part: 15

Ezra 3 is the third chapter of the Book of Ezra in the Old Testament of the Christian Bible, or the book of Ezra–Nehemiah in the Hebrew Bible, which treats the book of Ezra and book of Nehemiah as one book. Jewish tradition states that Ezra is the author of Ezra–Nehemiah as well as the Book of Chronicles, but modern scholars generally accept that a compiler from the 5th century BCE (the so-called "Chronicler") is the final author of these books. The section comprising chapter 1 to 6 describes the history before the arrival of Ezra in the land of Judah in 468 BCE. This chapter focuses on the people's worship and culminates in the project to rebuild the temple's foundations.

== Text ==
The original text is written in Hebrew language. This chapter is divided into 13 verses.

=== Textual witnesses ===
Some early manuscripts containing the text of this chapter in Hebrew are of the Masoretic Text, which includes Codex Leningradensis (1008). (Note: Since 1947 the current text of Aleppo Codex is missing the whole book of Ezra–Nehemiah.)

There is also a translation into Koine Greek known as the Septuagint, made in the last few centuries BCE. Extant ancient manuscripts of the Septuagint version include Codex Vaticanus (B; $\mathfrak{G}$^{B}; 4th century), and Codex Alexandrinus (A; $\mathfrak{G}$^{A}; 5th century). (Note: The extant Codex Sinaiticus only contains Ezra 9:9–10:44.)

An ancient Greek book called 1 Esdras (Greek: Ἔσδρας Αʹ) containing some parts of 2 Chronicles, Ezra and Nehemiah is included in most editions of the Septuagint and is placed before the single book of Ezra–Nehemiah (which is titled in Greek: Ἔσδρας Βʹ). 1 Esdras 5:47-65 is an equivalent of Ezra 3 (Feast of Tabernacles).

== The Altar (3:1–6) ==
Before reestablishing legitimate worship at the temple, which still needed to be rebuilt, the people repaired the altar and performed the sacrifices according to the Torah.

=== Verse 1 ===
And when the seventh month was come, and the children of Israel were in the cities, the people gathered themselves together as one man to Jerusalem.

"The seventh month", Tishrei, follows the liturgical calendar of Israel (cf. Exodus 12; 23; Leviticus 23; Numbers 28–29; Deuteronomy 16, which begins in the first month when the Passover is celebrated. Three central feasts are celebrated in the seventh month, making it the “preeminent month” in the calendar. The seventh month of the first year of the return of the exiles corresponds to September/October 537 BC.

=== Verse 2 ===
Then Jeshua the son of Jozadak and his brethren the priests, and Zerubbabel the son of Shealtiel and his brethren, arose and built the altar of the God of Israel, to offer burnt offerings on it, as it is written in the Law of Moses the man of God.

- "Jeshua": or "Joshua". His office is not named in this book, but he is identified as the "high priest" in Haggai 1:1, 12, 14; 2:2; and Zechariah 3:1.
- "Jozadak": or "Jehozadak" (1 Chronicles 6:14).
- "Zerubbabel" is the leader of the group and of Davidic line (1 Chronicles 3:19), so he is associated with the messianic hope in the book of Zechariah, although none of it is mentioned in this book. His office is not named in this book, but he is identified as the "governor of Judah" in Haggai 1:1, 14; 2:2.

=== Verse 3 ===
Though fear had come upon them because of the people of those countries, they set the altar on its bases; and they offered burnt offerings on it to the Lord, both the morning and evening burnt offerings.

The morning and evening burnt offerings are those prescribed in Exodus 29:38 and Numbers 28:3–8.

== The Temple (3:7–13) ==
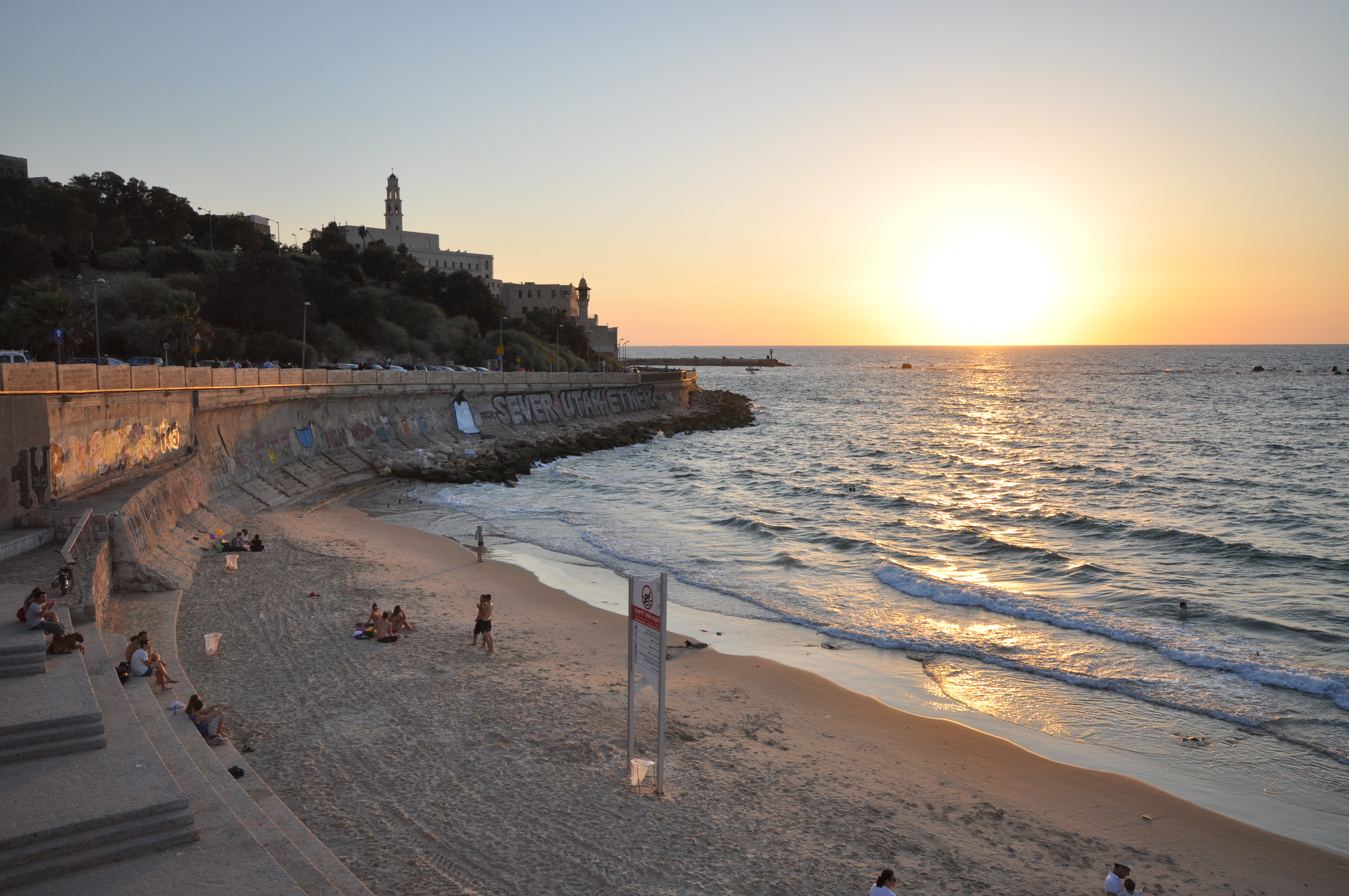
Old Jaffa (Joppa); Hebrew: יָפוֹ) is the southern, oldest part of Tel Aviv-Jaffa (since 1950), an ancient port city in Israel, functioned as the port-of-entry for the cedars of Lebanon for Solomon's Temple, and the Second Temple of Jerusalem (Ezra 3:7).

After reintroduced worship at the former site of altar (in Solomon's Temple), the building of a new temple is initiated. Both the building of the altar and the foundation of the temple showed similarities to the first temple, such as the importation of cedars from Lebanon (2 Chronicles 2:16) and the start of the project in the second month (which could be the appropriate time in early spring; cf. 1 Kings 6:1). When the foundation of temple was laid, the people responded in different ways: the older ones who had seen the first temple wept loudly, while the younger ones gave a great shout of praise to God.

=== Verse 7 ===
They gave money to the masons and carpenters, and food, drink, and oil to the people of Sidon and to the people of Tyre so that they would bring cedar trees from Lebanon to the sea, at Joppa, according to the grant they had from Cyrus king of Persia.

The laborers and materials for the temple came from Sidon and Tyre in Lebanon, as had those supplied for the Solomon's temple (1 Kings 5:8–9; 1 Chronicles 22:4). By this date, Tyre and Sidon were also subject to Cyrus the Great.

=== Verse 10 ===
And when the builders laid the foundation of the temple of the Lord, they set the priests in their apparel with trumpets, and the Levites the sons of Asaph with cymbals, to praise the Lord, after the ordinance of David king of Israel.

- "They set the priests" or "they stationed the priests" according to the Masoretic Text, whereas LXX, Syriac Peshitta and Latin Vulgate render it "the priests stood".
- "Ordinance": lit. "hands", from Hebrew: יְדֵ֖י, yə-ḏê.

=== Verse 11 ===
And they sang responsively, praising and giving thanks to the Lord:

"For He is good,
For His mercy endures forever toward Israel."

Then all the people shouted with a great shout, when they praised the Lord, because the foundation of the house of the Lord was laid.

The same song was sung at the dedication of the first temple (Solomon's Temple) over four centuries earlier (2 Chronicles 7:3).

== See also ==
- Jerusalem
- Joppa
- Sukkot
- Related Bible parts: Ezra 2, Haggai 2

== Sources ==
- Fensham, F. Charles (1982). The Books of Ezra and Nehemiah. New international commentary on the Old Testament (illustrated ed.). Wm. B. Eerdmans Publishing. ISBN 978-0802825278.
- Grabbe, Lester L. (2003). "Ezra". In Dunn, James D. G.; Rogerson, John William (eds.). Eerdmans Commentary on the Bible (illustrated ed.). Wm. B. Eerdmans Publishing. pp. 313–319. ISBN 978-0802837110.
- Halley, Henry H. (1965). Halley's Bible Handbook: an abbreviated Bible commentary (24th (revised) ed.). Zondervan Publishing House. ISBN 0-310-25720-4.
- Larson, Knute; Dahlen, Kathy; Anders, Max E. (2005). Anders, Max E. (ed.). Holman Old Testament Commentary - Ezra, Nehemiah, Esther. Holman Old Testament commentary. Vol. 9 (illustrated ed.). B&H Publishing Group. ISBN 978-0805494693.
- Levering, Matthew (2007). Ezra & Nehemiah. Brazos Theological Commentary on the Bible. Brazos Press. ISBN 978-1587431616.
- McConville, J. G. (1985). Ezra, Nehemiah, and Esther. The daily study Bible : Old Testament. Westminster John Knox Press. ISBN 978-0664245832.
- Smith-Christopher, Daniel L. (2007). "15. Ezra-Nehemiah". In Barton, John; Muddiman, John (eds.). The Oxford Bible Commentary (first (paperback) ed.). Oxford University Press. pp. 308–324. ISBN 978-0199277186.
- Würthwein, Ernst (1995). The Text of the Old Testament. Translated by Rhodes, Erroll F. Grand Rapids, MI: Wm. B. Eerdmans. ISBN 0-8028-0788-7.
