= Nehemiah 11 =

Chapter in the Old Testament Book of Nehemiah

- ← chapter 10 chapter 12 →
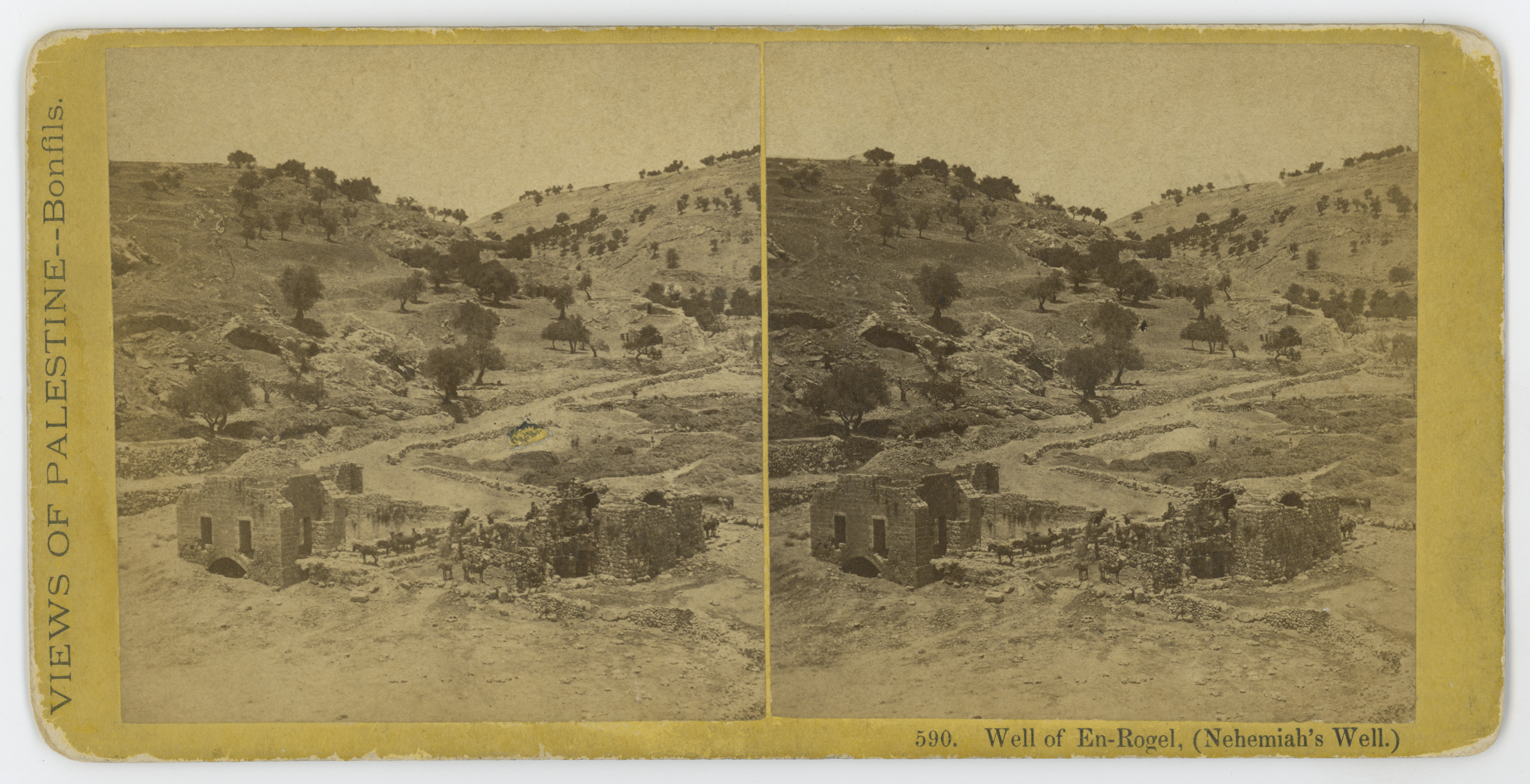
- "Well of En-Rogel" (Nehemiah's Well) in ca. 1870, by Felix-Adrien Bonfils (1831-1885). Jerusalem, Israel.
- Book: Book of Nehemiah
- Category: Ketuvim
- Christian Bible part: Old Testament
- Order in the Christian part: 16

Nehemiah 11 is the eleventh chapter of the Book of Nehemiah in the Old Testament of the Christian Bible, or the 21st chapter of the book of Ezra-Nehemiah in the Hebrew Bible, which treats the book of Ezra and the book of Nehemiah as one book. Jewish tradition states that Ezra is the author of Ezra-Nehemiah as well as the Book of Chronicles, but modern scholars generally accept that a compiler from the 5th century BCE (the so-called "Chronicler") is the final author of these books. The chapter describes the repopulation of Jerusalem. Judahites (4-6), Benjamites (7-9), priests (10-14), Levites (15-18), gatekeepers (19) and "the rest of Israel" (20-21). Roles in relation to leadership, maintenance and prayer in the Temple are allocated. The people cast lots and 1 of 10 are to volunteer to live in the city (still having military duties) whilst the remainder repopulate the surrounding areas ( possession of the land theme).

== Text ==
The original text of this chapter is in Hebrew language. This chapter is divided into 36 verses.

=== Textual witnesses ===
Some early manuscripts containing the text of this chapter in Hebrew are of the Masoretic Text, which includes Codex Leningradensis (1008). (Note: Since the anti-Jewish riots in Aleppo in 1947, the whole book of Ezra-Nehemiah has been missing from the text of the Aleppo Codex.)

There is also a translation into Koine Greek known as the Septuagint, made in the last few centuries BCE. Extant ancient manuscripts of the Septuagint version include Codex Vaticanus (B; $\mathfrak{G}$^{B}; 4th century), Codex Sinaiticus (S; BHK: $\mathfrak{G}$^{S}; 4th century), and Codex Alexandrinus (A; $\mathfrak{G}$^{A}; 5th century).

== Repopulation of Judah (11:1–30) ==
Jerusalem, as the provincial capital, already had a sizeable number of population, but mostly of the ruling class, close to leadership positions. Nehemiah was recorded as having 150 officials dining with him in Nehemiah 5:17. Anglican commentator H. E. Ryle refers to a suggestion that the rulers or princes, before Nehemiah took the matter in hand, had resided in the country. However, the city needed more general population in order to grow. The people who would move to Jerusalem were determined by casting lots, one each out of groups of ten family representatives. The detailed list (verses 3–24) demonstrates that each group living outside the city was well represented by families living within its walls.

Among the cities resettled by the returning populations are mentioned Qiryat-arba, Zorah, Jarmuth, Zanoah, Adullam, and Lachish.

=== Verse 1 ===
And the rulers of the people dwelt at Jerusalem: the rest of the people also cast lots, to bring one of ten to dwell in Jerusalem the holy city, and nine parts to dwell in other cities..

Jerusalem is also called "the holy city verse 18. Ryle notes that "the occurrence of this title in Scripture may be illustrated by Isaiah 48:2, For they call themselves of the holy city and Isaiah 52:1, O Jerusalem, the holy city", see also Daniel 9:24 and Joel 3:17. In the New Testament it occurs in Matthew 4:5 and Matthew 27:53, see also Revelation 11:2; Revelation 21:2; Revelation 21:10; Revelation 22:19. The New English Translation explains that "the word 'hand' is used here in the sense or a part or portion".

=== Verse 16 ===
And Shabbethai and Jozabad, of the chief of the Levites, had the oversight of the outward business of the house of God.

- "Of the chief": Hebrew: "who were of the heads".
- "House" (as in Hebrew): refers to the "Temple".

=== Verse 23 ===
For it was the king's commandment concerning them, that a certain portion should be for the singers, due for every day.

- "The king's commandment concerning them": Hebrew: "the commandment of the king was over them".
- "A certain portion": or "fixed share".
- "Due for every day": Hebrew: "a thing of a day in its day".

== Outside Jerusalem (11:25–36) ==
This part scans the Jewish habitation outside Jerusalem with enclaves and settlements throughout the Judean countryside, listing the towns of Judah (verses 25–30), the towns of Benjamin (verses 31–35) and a note on the dwellings of the Levites (verse 36).

=== Verse 31 ===
Also the children of Benjamin from Geba dwelt in Michmash, Aija, and Bethel, and their villages;

- "Also the children of": Hebrew MT reads וּבְנֵי (ubene, "and the sons of"), but a few medieval Hebrew manuscripts and the Syriac Peshitta read וּמִבְּנֵי (umibene, "and some of the descendants of"; cf. NLT).

=== Verse 36 ===
And of the Levites were divisions in Judah, and in Benjamin.

Based on Joshua 21, the Levites was not given land as inheritance, for 'their portion was the Lord and the honor of his service', but they were given a share of specific towns among the various tribes of Israel.

== See also ==
- Jerusalem
- Tribe of Benjamin
- Related Bible parts: Joshua 21, Nehemiah 10

== Sources ==
- Fensham, F. Charles (1982). The Books of Ezra and Nehemiah. New international commentary on the Old Testament (illustrated ed.). Wm. B. Eerdmans Publishing. ISBN 978-0802825278.
- Grabbe, Lester L. (2003). "Nehemiah". In Dunn, James D. G.; Rogerson, John William (eds.). Eerdmans Commentary on the Bible (illustrated ed.). Wm. B. Eerdmans Publishing. pp. 320–328. ISBN 978-0802837110.
- Halley, Henry H. (1965). Halley's Bible Handbook: an abbreviated Bible commentary (24th (revised) ed.). Zondervan Publishing House. ISBN 0-310-25720-4.
- Larson, Knute; Dahlen, Kathy; Anders, Max E. (2005). Anders, Max E. (ed.). Holman Old Testament Commentary - Ezra, Nehemiah, Esther. Vol. 9 (illustrated ed.). B&H Publishing Group. ISBN 978-0805494693.
- Levering, Matthew (2007). Ezra & Nehemiah. Brazos Theological Commentary on the Bible. Brazos Press. ISBN 978-1587431616.
- McConville, J. G. (1985). Ezra, Nehemiah, and Esther. The daily study Bible : Old Testament. Westminster John Knox Press. ISBN 978-0664245832.
- Smith-Christopher, Daniel L. (2007). "15. Ezra-Nehemiah". In Barton, John; Muddiman, John (eds.). The Oxford Bible Commentary (first (paperback) ed.). Oxford University Press. pp. 308–324. ISBN 978-0199277186.
- Würthwein, Ernst (1995). The Text of the Old Testament. Translated by Rhodes, Erroll F. Grand Rapids, MI: Wm. B. Eerdmans. ISBN 0-8028-0788-7.
