= Shecaniah =

Shecaniah or Shechaniah, which means "one intimate with God", is the name of a number of characters mentioned in the Hebrew Bible.

- A priest to whom the tenth lot came forth when David divided the priests (1 Chronicles 24:11).
- One of the priests who were set "to give to their brethren by courses" of the daily portion (2 Chronicles 31:15).
- Shechani'ah, a priest whose sons are mentioned in 1 Chronicles 3:21, 22.
- In a genealogy of those who returned to Judea with Ezra, there are references to "Shecaniah, who was of the sons of Parosh, Zechariah, with whom were registered 150 men", and to "Shecaniah the son of Jahaziel", who was "of the sons of Zattu".
- The first of the Jews who responded to Ezra's prayer regarding the returning exiles' marriages with foreigners.
- The father of Shemaiah, who repaired the wall of Jerusalem (Nehemiah 3:29).
- The father-in-law of Tobiah (Nehemiah 6:18).
- A priest who returned from the Babylonian captivity with Zerubbabel (Nehemiah 12:3; marg., or Shebaniah).

== See also ==
- Shekhinah
