= Priestly divisions =

Work divisions of Jewish priests in the Temple

The priestly divisions or sacerdotal courses (Hebrew: מִשְׁמָר mishmar) are the groups into which kohanim "priests" were divided for service in the Temple in Jerusalem in ancient Judea.

The 24 priestly divisions are first listed in 1 Chronicles 24.

== Role in the Temple ==
1 Chronicles 24 refers to these priests as "descendants of Aaron." According to the Bible, Aaron had four sons: Nadab and Abihu, Eleazar and Ithamar. However, Nadab and Abihu died before Aaron, and only Eleazar and Ithamar had sons. In Chronicles, one priest (Zadok) from Eleazar's descendants, and another priest, Ahimelech, from Ithamar's descendants, were designated by David, ruler of the United Kingdom of Israel, to help create the various priestly work groups. Sixteen of Eleazar's descendants were selected to head priestly orders, while only eight of Ithamar's descendants were so chosen; this imbalance was done because of the greater number of leaders among Eleazar's descendants.

According to the Talmud, the 24-family division was an expansion of a previous division by Moses into 8 (or 16) divisions. According to Maimonides, the separation of priests into divisions was already commanded in the time of Moses in Deuteronomy 18:8.

Lots were drawn to designate the order of Temple service for the different priestly orders according to 1 Chronicles 24:5. Each order was responsible for ministering during a different week and Shabbat and was stationed at the Temple. All orders were present during biblical festivals. Their duties involved offering the daily and holiday korbanot "sacrifices" and administering the Priestly Blessing to the people. The change between shifts took place on Shabbat at midday, with the outgoing shift performing the morning sacrifice and the incoming shift the afternoon sacrifice according to Sukkah 56b.

According to the Jerusalem Talmud (Ta‘anith 4:2 / 20a): "Four wards came up out of exile: Yedaiah, Harim, Pašḥūr and Immer. The prophets among them had made a stipulation with them, namely, that even if Jehoiariv should come up out of exile, the officiating ward that serves in the Temple at that time should not be rejected on his account, but rather, he is to become secondary unto them."

Many modern scholars treat these priestly courses either as a reflection of practices after the Babylonian captivity or as an idealized portrait of how the Chronicler (writing in c. 350–300 BCE) thought Temple administration ought to occur. The reference to David was how the Chronicler legitimized his views about the priesthood. At the end of the Second Temple period, it is clear that the divisions worked in the order specified.

== Following the Temple's destruction ==
Following the Temple's destruction at the end of the First Jewish–Roman War and the displacement to the Galilee of the bulk of the remaining Jewish population in Judea at the end of the Bar Kochba revolt, Jewish tradition in the Talmud and poems from the period record that the descendants of each priestly watch established a separate residential seat in towns and villages of the Galilee, and maintained this residential pattern for at least several centuries in anticipation of the reconstruction of the Temple and reinstitution of the cycle of priestly courses. Specifically, this Kohanic settlement region stretched from the Beit Netofa Valley through the Nazareth region to Arbel and the vicinity of Tiberias.

== List ==
| Division | Name | Mishnaic residence | should start working | | | | | |
|---|---|---|---|---|---|---|---|---|
| First | Jehoiarib | Meron | 27/1/2024 | 13/7/2024 | 28/12/2024 | 14/6/2025 | 29/11/2025 | 16/5/2026 |
| Second | Jedaiah | Tzippori | 3/2/2024 | 20/7/2024 | 4/1/2025 | 21/6/2025 | 6/12/2025 | 23/5/2026 |
| Third | Harim | Fassuta | 10/2/2024 | 27/7/2024 | 11/1/2025 | 28/6/2025 | 13/12/2025 | 30/5/2026 |
| Fourth | Seorim | Ayta ash Shab or Ilut | 17/2/2024 | 3/8/2024 | 18/1/2025 | 5/7/2025 | 20/12/2025 | 6/6/2026 |
| Fifth | Malchijah | Bethlehem of Galilee | 24/2/2024 | 10/8/2024 | 25/1/2025 | 12/7/2025 | 27/12/2025 | 13/6/2026 |
| Sixth | Mijamin | Yodfat | 2/3/2024 | 17/8/2024 | 1/2/2025 | 19/7/2025 | 3/1/2026 | 20/6/2026 |
| Seventh | Hakkoz | Eilabun | 9/3/2024 | 24/8/2024 | 8/2/2025 | 26/7/2025 | 10/1/2026 | 27/6/2026 |
| Eighth | Abijah | Kfar Uziel | 16/3/2024 | 31/8/2024 | 15/2/2025 | 2/8/2025 | 17/1/2026 | 4/7/2026 |
| Ninth | Jeshua | Arbel | 23/3/2024 | 7/9/2024 | 22/2/2025 | 9/8/2025 | 24/1/2026 | 11/7/2026 |
| Tenth | Shecaniah | Kabul | 30/3/2024 | 14/9/2024 | 1/3/2025 | 16/8/2025 | 31/1/2026 | 18/7/2026 |
| Eleventh | Eliashib | Kafr Kana | 6/4/2024 | 21/9/2024 | 8/3/2025 | 23/8/2025 | 7/2/2026 | 25/7/2026 |
| Twelfth | Jakim | Safed | 13/4/2024 | 28/9/2024 | 15/3/2025 | 30/8/2025 | 14/2/2026 | 1/8/2026 |
| Thirteenth | Huppah | Beit Maon | 20/4/2024 | 5/10/2024 | 22/3/2025 | 6/9/2025 | 21/2/2026 | 8/8/2026 |
| Fourteenth | Jeshebeab | Shikhin | 27/4/2024 | 12/10/2024 | 29/3/2025 | 13/9/2025 | 28/2/2026 | 15/8/2026 |
| Fifteenth | Bilgah | Maghar | 4/5/2024 | 19/10/2024 | 5/4/2025 | 20/9/2025 | 7/3/2026 | 22/8/2026 |
| Sixteenth | Immer | Yavnit | 11/5/2024 | 26/10/2024 | 12/4/2025 | 27/9/2025 | 14/3/2026 | 29/8/2026 |
| Seventeenth | Hezir | Kfar Mimlah | 18/5/2024 | 2/11/2024 | 19/4/2025 | 4/10/2025 | 21/3/2026 | 5/9/2026 |
| Eighteenth | Happizzez | Nazareth (or Daburiyya) | 25/5/2024 | 9/11/2024 | 26/4/2025 | 11/10/2025 | 28/3/2026 | 12/9/2026 |
| Nineteenth | Pethahiah | Arraba | 1/6/2024 | 16/11/2024 | 3/5/2025 | 18/10/2025 | 4/4/2026 | 19/9/2026 |
| Twentieth | Jehezkel | Magdala | 8/6/2024 | 23/11/2024 | 10/5/2025 | 25/10/2025 | 11/4/2026 | 26/9/2026 |
| Twenty-first | Jachin | Deir Hanna (or Kafr 'Inan) | 15/6/2024 | 30/11/2024 | 17/5/2025 | 1/11/2025 | 18/4/2026 | 3/10/2026 |
| Twenty-second | Gamul | Kawkab al-Hawa | 22/6/2024 | 7/12/2024 | 24/5/2025 | 8/11/2025 | 25/4/2026 | 10/10/2026 |
| Twenty-third | Delaiah | Tzalmon | 29/6/2024 | 14/12/2024 | 31/5/2025 | 15/11/2025 | 2/5/2026 | 17/10/2026 |
| Twenty-fourth | Maaziah | Hammat Tiberias | 6/7/2024 | 21/12/2024 | 7/6/2025 | 22/11/2025 | 9/5/2026 | 24/10/2026 |

== Commemoration ==
After the destruction, there was a custom of publicly recalling every Sabbath in the synagogues the courses of the priests, a practice that reinforced the prestige of the priests' lineage. Such mention evoked the hope of return to Jerusalem and reconstruction of the Temple.

A manuscript discovered in the Cairo Geniza, dated 1034 CE, records a customary formula recited weekly in the synagogues, during the Sabbath day: "Today is the holy Sabbath, the holy Sabbath unto the Lord; this day, which is the course? [Appropriate name] is the course. May the Merciful One return the course to its place soon, in our days. Amen." After which, they would recount the number of years that have passed since the destruction of Jerusalem, and conclude with the words: "May the Merciful One build his house and sanctuary, and let them say Amen."

Eleazar ben Kalir (7th century) wrote a liturgical poem detailing the 24-priestly wards and their places of residence. Historian and geographer, Samuel Klein (1886–1940), thinks that Killir's poem proves the prevalence of this custom of commemorating the courses in the synagogues of the Land of Israel. A number of such piyyutim have been composed, and to this day some are recited by Jews as part of the Tisha Beav kinnot.

=== Archaeology ===
Several stone inscriptions have been discovered bearing partial lists of the priestly wards, their order and the name of the locality to which they had moved after the destruction of the Second Temple:

In 1920, a stone inscription was found in Ashkelon showing a partial list of the priestly wards. In 1962 three small fragments of one Hebrew stone inscription bearing the partial names of places associated with the priestly courses (the rest of which had been reconstructed) were found in Caesarea Maritima, dated to the third-fourth centuries.

In 1961 a stone inscription referencing "The nineteenth course, Petaḥia" was found west of Kissufim.

==== Yemenite inscription (DJE 23) ====
In 1970 a stone inscription was found on a partially buried column in a mosque, in the village of Bayt Ḥaḍir, Yemen, showing ten names of the priestly wards and their respective towns and villages. The Yemeni inscription is the longest roster of names of this sort to be discovered. Professor Yosef Tobi, describing this inscription (named DJE 23) writes:

As for the probable strong spiritual attachment held by the Jews of Ḥimyar for the Land of Israel, this is also attested to by an inscription bearing the names of the miśmarōṯ (priestly wards), which was initially discovered in September 1970 by W. Müller and then, independently, by P. Grjaznevitch within a mosque in Bayt al-Ḥāḍir, a village situated near Tan‘im, east of Ṣanʻā’. This inscription has been published by several European scholars, but the seminal study was carried out by E.E. Urbach (1973), one of the most important scholars of rabbinic literature in the previous generation. The priestly wards were seen as one of the most distinctive elements in the collective memory of the Jewish people as a nation during the period of Roman and Byzantine rule in the Land of Israel following the destruction of the Second Temple, insofar as they came to symbolize Jewish worship within the Land.

Though a complete list of sacerdotal names numbers at twenty-four, the surviving inscription is fragmentary and only eleven names remain. The place of residence of each listed individual in Galilee is also listed.

The names legible on the Yemenite column read as follows:

| English Translation | Original Hebrew |
|---|---|
| [Se‘orim ‘Ayṯoh-lo], fourth ward | שְׂעוֹרִים עיתהלו משמר הרביעי |
| [Malkiah, Beṯ]-Lehem, the fif[th] ward | מַלְכִּיָּה בית לחם משמר החמשי |
| Miyamin, Yudfaṯ (Jotapata), the sixth ward | מִיָמִין יודפת משמר הששי |
| [Haqo]ṣ, ‘Ailebu, the seventh ward | הַקּוֹץ עילבו משמר השביעי |
| Aviah ‘Iddo, Kefar ‘Uzziel, the (eighth) ward | אֲבִיָּה עדו כפר עוזיאל משמר |
| the eighth (ward). Yešūa‘, Nišdaf-arbel | השמיני יֵשׁוּעַ נשדפארבל |
| the ninth ward | משמר התשיעי |
| Šekhaniyahu, ‘Avurah Cabūl, the t[enth] ward | שְׁכַנְיָה עבורה כבול משמר העשירי |
| Eliašīv, Cohen Qanah, the elev[enth] ward | אֶלְיָשִׁיב כהן קנה משמר אחד עשר |
| Yaqīm Pašḥūr, Ṣefaṯ (Safed), the twelf[th] ward | יָקִים פַּשְׁחוּר צפת משמר שנים עשר |
| [Ḥū]ppah, Beṯ-Ma‘on, the (thirteenth) ward | חוּפָּה בית מעון משמר שלשה |
| the thirteenth (ward). Yešav’av, Ḥuṣpiṯ Šuḥīn | עשר יֶשֶׁבְאָב חוצפית שוחין |
| the fourteenth wa[rd] | משמר ארבע עשר |

== See also ==
- Twenty-four priestly gifts
