= Walter W. Müller =

German semitologist (1933–2024)

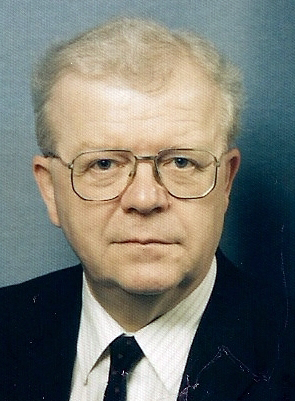
Walter W. Müller in 2009

Walter Wilhelm Müller (26 September 1933 – 22 October 2024) was a German specialist in the field of ancient South Arabia and Semitic epigraphy.

After studying Semitic and Arabic studies at the University of Tübingen Müller graduated in 1962. He subsequently worked as an academic assistant at the Institute for Semitic Studies; he became a professor in 1968 and in 1973 was appointed an extraordinary professor. In 1975 he was called to be an ordinary professor for Semitic Studies at the Philipps-Universität in Marburg. In 2001 he became professor emeritus. Since 1978 Müller was a corresponding member of the German Archaeological Institute, since 1987 ordinary member of the Academy of Sciences and Literature in Mainz, since 1990 a member of the Sudeten German Academy of Sciences and Arts, and since 2001 a corresponding member of the British Academy.

Müller devoted himself to the study of South Arabia, especially from a linguistic and economic point of view.

Müller died on 22 October 2024, at the age of 91.

== Works ==
- Weihrauch. Ein arabisches Produkt und seine Bedeutung in der Antike, München 1978 (Sonderdruck aus: Paulys Realencyclopädie der classischen Altertumswissenschaft, Suppl.-Bd. 15, München 1974, pp. 701–777)
- With Alfred Felix Landon Beeston, Mahmud al-Ghul, Jacques Ryckmans: Sabaic Dictionary / Dictionnaire sabéen, Louvain-la-Neuve, Peeters 1982, ISBN 2-8017-0194-7
- Südarabien im Altertum. Kommentierte Bibliographie der Jahre 1973 bis 1996, Rahden/Westf., Leidorf 2001, ISBN 3-89646-682-8

== Bibliography ==
- Norbert Nebes (Hrsg.): Arabia felix. Beiträge zur Sprache und Kultur des vorislamischen Arabien. Festschrift Walter W. Müller zum 60. Geburtstag, Wiesbaden, Harrassowitz 1994. ISBN 3-447-03603-6 (Pp. XI - XXXIV Bibliography)
- Kürschners Deutscher Gelehrten-Kalender, 21st edition (2007), pp. 2491–2492.
