= List of Jewish prayers and blessings =

Listed below are some Hebrew language prayers and berakhot (blessings) that are part of Judaism that are recited by many Jews. Most prayers and blessings can be found in the Siddur, or prayer book. This article addresses Jewish liturgical blessings, which generally begin with the formula:

בָּרוּךְ אַתָּה יהוה אֱלֹהֵינוּּ, מֶלֶך הָעוֹלָם...

Transliteration: Bārukh attā ad̲onāy elohēnu, melekh hāʿolām...

Translation: "Blessed are You, LORD our God, King of the universe..."

== Pronunciation ==
In the transliterations below, ' is used to refer to the sh'vah, which is similar/equivalent to ə; a mid-word aleph, a glottal stop; and a mid-word ayin, a voiced pharyngeal fricative ʕ similar/equivalent to Arabic: ع. Whenever ` is used, it refers to ayin whether word-initial, medial, or final. 'H/h' are used to represent both he, an English h sound as in "hat"; and ḥet, a voiceless pharyngeal fricative ħ equivalent to Arabic ح. Whenever 'ḥ' is used, it refers to ḥet. In all other regards, transliterations are according to Sephardi Hebrew.

== Daily prayers ==
=== Waking up ===
Modeh Ani	מודה אני	Modeh Ani is a short prayer recited first thing after waking in the morning. Thanking God for all he does.
Elohai Neshamah	אלהי נשמה	Thanking God for restoring the soul in the morning. Said following washing the hands and Asher Yatzar blessings.
Blessings over the Torah	ברכות התורה	Thanking God for giving us the Torah and a blessing on the Torah that will be learned over the course of the day. Followed by some short passages from Torah and the Mishnah (in some customs, followed immediate by Seder Korbanot, which is also a selection of Torah passages).
Morning blessings	ברכות השחר	Blessings thanking God for most of the basic functions of our lives (sight, clothes, movement etc.)
Seder Korbanot	סדר הקרבנות	Recounting the order of the day in the Temple service. Includes the description of the daily sacrifice from the Book of Numbers and chapter 5 of Zevachim that contains a list of all the types of sacrifices that were given.
13 midot of Rabi Yishmael	ברייתא דרבי ישמעאל	A passage of learning from the Oral Law. It is a list of the 13 principles that Rabi Yishmael would use to interpret the Torah.

=== Pesuke dezimra ===
This portion of the prayers acts as an introduction to the morning prayers. The following is the order of the Nusach Ashkenaz:

Mizmor Shir	מזמור שיר	Psalm 30. Recited in the Eastern Ashkenazic rite at the beginning of pesukei dezimra. In the Western Ashkenazi rite, as well as according to the custom of the Vilna Gaon, it is not recited in pesuke dezimra.
Barukh she'amar	ברוך שאמר	The first blessing of pesukei dezimra
Songs of thanksgiving		A series of paragraphs in pesukei dezimra. Includes Psalm 100
Yehi kevod	יהי כבוד	A series of verses recited during pesukei dezimra
Ashrei	אשרי	Recited three times daily: during pesukei dezimra, preceding Uva letzion, and at the beginning of Mincha (in the Ashkenazi rite, it is recited instead in Ne'ila on Yom Kippur)
Hallel (pesukei dezimra)	הלל	Includes Ashrei and Psalms 146, 147, 148, 149, and 150
Baruch HaShem Le'Olam	ברוך ה לעולם	Recited as a blessing after concluding Hallel
Vayivarech David	ויברך דוד	From Chronicles 1:29, verses 10–13
Ata Hu Hashem L'Vadecha	אתה-הוא יהוה לבדך	From Nehemiah 9, verses 6–11
Az Yashir	אז ישיר	From Book of Exodus 15:1–18
Yishtabach	ישתבח	Concluding blessing of Pesukei Dezimra

=== Shema and its blessings ===
The Shema prayers are said every day in Shacharit and Maariv. There are always two blessings before the Shema, but after the Shema in the day there is only one blessing, and at night there are two (or three in some communities).

Yotzer ohr	יוצר אור	The first blessing recited prior to Shema during Shacharit
Maariv Aravim	מעריב ערבים	The first blessing recited prior to Shema during Maariv
Ahava rabbah	אהבה רבה	The second blessing recited prior to Shema during Shacharit (some communities begin this blessing with "Ahavat Olam")
Ahavat Olam	אהבת עולם	The second blessing recited prior to Shema during Maariv
Shema	שמע ישראל	A centerpiece of Jewish prayer services that affirms belief and trust in the One God, the Shema is composed of three sections taken from the Torah.
Emet Veyatziv	אמת ויציב	The only blessing recited following the Shema during Shacharit
Emet VeEmunah	אמת ואמונה	The first blessing recited following the Shema during Maariv
Hashkiveinu	השכיבנו	The second blessing recited following the Shema during Maariv
Baruch HaShem Le'Olam for Maariv	ברוך ליהוה לעולם	The third blessing recited following the Shema during Maariv. This blessing is only said by some communities, mostly outside of Israel. It is omitted in the vast majority of communities in Israel, and it is not said today by anyone on Shabbat or Yom Tov, although historically it was said in some communities on the Sabbath.

=== Amida ===
The "standing [prayer]", also known as the Shemoneh Esreh ("The Eighteen"), consisting of 19 strophes on weekdays and seven on Sabbath days and 9 on Rosh haShana Mussaf. It is the essential component of Jewish services, and is the only service that the Talmud calls prayer. It is said three times a day (four times on Sabbaths and holidays, and five times on Yom Kippur). The source for the Amida is either as a parallel to the sacrifices in the Temple, or in honor of the Jewish forefathers.

The prayer is divided into three sections: blessings of praise for God, requests for our needs (or exalting the holiness of the day for Shabbat and Yom Tov) and finally blessings of thanksgiving.

==== Praise ====
Avot	אבות	First blessing of the Amidah, and describes God's choosing of the Jewish patriarchs, and God's protection of them. Many non-Orthodox communities include the matriarchs in this blessing and therefore give it the name Avot v'imahot, meaning "fathers and mothers".
Gevurot	גבורות	Second blessing of the Amidah, describing God's might and God's mastery over the natural world.
Kedushat Hashem	קדושת השם	Third blessing of the Amidah, affirming the holiness of God. During the repetition of the Amida the Kedushah is added.

==== Middle blessings ====
On a regular weekday there are 13 supplicatory blessings. A small number of rabbis, such as David Bar-Hayim based on fragments from the Cairo Geniza, say only 12 blessings here.
On fast days in the times of the Talmud there were a number of additional blessings, and in communities today a 14th blessing is added to the Chazzan's repetition on fast days.

Daat	דעת	Asking for wisdom and understanding.
Teshuva	תשובה	Asking God to help us return to the Torah way of life.
Selicha	סליחה	Asking for God's forgiveness.
Geula	גאולה	Asking for God to rescue the Jewish people from our travails. On fast days during the repetition of the Amida, Aneinu is said here.
Refua	רפואה	Asking for good health.
Birkat Hashanim	ברכת השנים	Asking for a blessing for the produce of the earth. We also ask for the rain needed to sustain life. Broadly also asking for income. During times of drought a special prayer for rain is added here.
Kibutz Galuyot	קבוץ גלויות	Asking God to bring the Jews back from the Exile into Israel.
Mishpat	משפט	Asking God to judge us justly and to restore the judges to Israel.
Minim	מינים	Asking to destroy the heretical sects and informers. This blessing was a later addition to the Amida, and is the 19 blessing.
Tzadikim	צדיקים	Asking God to help and support righteous people.
Boneh Yerushalayim	בונה ירושלים	Asking to have Jerusalem rebuilt and returned to its former glory. On Tisha B'av the Nachem prayer is added here.
Malchut bet David	מלכות בית דוד	Asking for the monarchy to be reinstated and for David's descendants to become the kings. In some traditions, this blessing was merged with the previous one to maintain 18 blessings.
Shomea tefilla	שומע תפילה	Asking God to answer our prayers. Any additional requests can be added in this blessing. On fast days Aneinu is added here in the silent prayer.

On Shabbat and Yom Tov there is only a single blessing.

Kedushat hayom	קדושת היום	Describing the holiness of the particular day. In Mussaf it also describes the sacrifice that was brought in the Temple on that day.

During Mussaf of Rosh HaShana there are three blessings in the middle, each built around 10 verses from the Tanach around a particular theme.

Kedushat ha-yom/Malchuyot	קדושת היום/מלכויות	Describing the holiness of the particular day, and the sacrifice that was brought in the Temple on that day. It is expanded to include a description of how God was made king of the world on this day.
Zichronot	זכרונות	Mentioning the times that God has promised to remember the people of Israel.
Shofarot	שופרות	Describing various times and occasions that the Shofar was blown.

==== Thanksgiving ====
Avoda	עבודה	Thanking God for the Temple service and for accepting our prayers.
Modim	מודים	General thanksgiving. As the Chazan says this prayer in the repetition, the congregation reads a paragraph of thanksgiving silently.
Shalom	שלום	Thanking God for bringing peace into the world. When the Priestly Blessing is said it is added here.

==== Additions during the repetition ====
Kedushah	קדושה	Proclaiming the holiness of God, aid during the repetition of the Amida.
Modim d'rabanan	מודים דרבנן	Additional thanks to God, said while the Chazan is saying Modim during the repetition of the Amida.
Birkat Kohanim	ברכת כהנים	The "Priestly Blessing", recited by the Kohanim every day in Israel before the blessing for peace in Shacharit (and Mussaf on days with Mussaf). Outside of Israel, Ashkenazim and some Sephardim recite it only on Yom Tov, while other Sephardim recite it on Shabbat and Yom Tov or every day. Even in places where they do not recite it, the chazzan recites a mini version commemorating its recitation ('Eloheinu ve-Elohei avoteinu barkheinu ...') at any time when it could be recited (Shacharit, Mussaf, and on fast days at Mincha).

=== Concluding prayers ===
Tachanun	תחנון	Supplicatory prayer said during Shacharit and Mincha. Not said on Shabbat, Yom Tov and other festive days.
Hallel	הלל	Psalms 113–118, recited as a prayer of praise and thanksgiving on Jewish holidays. Hallel is said in one of two forms: Full Hallel and Partial Hallel.
Shir shel yom	שיר של יום	Daily psalm. Each day has a different chapter to be said. There are also special chapters to be said on some special days.
Ein Keloheinu	אין כאלהינו	A lyrical prayer recited at the end of services, praising God's uniqueness. Some traditions say it only on Shabbat and festivals, while others say it every day
Aleinu	עלינו	The Aleinu praises God for allowing the Jewish people to serve him, and expresses their hope that the whole world will recognize God and abandon idolatry.

=== Kaddish ===
An Aramaic prayer which focuses on the idea of magnification and sanctification of God's name. There are five versions of kaddish for different purposes.

Half kaddish	חצי קדיש	A short version of kaddish to mark the end of a section of prayers.
Full kaddish	קדיש שלם	A longer version of kaddish to mark the end one of the major prayers, and is said after the amida.
Kaddish yatom	קדיש יתום	A version said by mourners in the 11 months following the death of a parent.
Kaddish d'rabanan	קדיש דרבנן	Said following study of the Oral Law.
Kaddish hagadol	קדיש הגדול	Said at a siyum for learning a tractate of Talmud or at the funeral of a parent.

=== Additional poetry used regularly in prayers ===
An'im Zemirot	אנעים זמירות	More formally known as "The Song of Glory", this song is sung in many Ashkenazic communities at the end of morning prayers on Shabbat. It is also recited following Maariv on Yom Kippur.
Ma Tovu	מה טובו	A prayer of reverence for the synagogue, recited in the morning upon entering. In the Western Ashkenazic rite, it is also sometimes recited at the beginning of Maariv on Festivals.
Adon Olam	אדון עולם	A poem discussing God's rule of the world.
Yigdal	יגדל	A poetic version of Maimonides' 13 principles of faith.

=== Other prayers ===
Kol Nidre	כל‑נדרי	A prayer recited in the synagogue at the beginning of the evening service on Yom Kippur (יום כיפור), the Day of Atonement. It is a declaration of absolution from vows taken, to free the congregants from guilt due to unfulfilled vows during the previous (and/or coming) year.
Kabalat Shabbat	קבלת שבת	A series of psalms that are said before Maariv on Shabbat to welcome the Shabbat queen.
Lecha Dodi	לכה דודי	Poem that is often sung part of kabbalat Shabbat.
Hoshanot	הושענות	Prayer said on Sukkot while circling the bimah. There is an extended version said on Hoshana Raba

== Blessings on the mitzvot ==
=== Shabbat ===
These blessings are also relevant to the festivals with some minor changes to the wording.

Blessing	Hebrew	Transliteration	English
Lighting candles	בָּרוּךְ אַתָּה יהוה, אֱלֹהֵינוּּ מֶלֶךְ הָעוֹלָם, אֲשֶׁר קִדְּשָׁנוּ בְּמִצְוֹתָיו, וְצִוָּנוּ לְהַדְלִיק נֵר שֶׁל שַׁבָּת.	Barukh ata Adonai Eloheinu, Melekh ha'olam, asher kid'shanu b'mitzvotav v'tzivanu l'hadlik ner shel Shabbat.	Blessed are You, LORD our God, King of the universe, Who has sanctified us with His commandments and commanded us to light the Shabbat candle[s].
Kiddush (Ashkenazi)	בָּרוּךְ אַתָּה יהוה אֱלֹהֵינוּּ מֶלֶךְ הָעוֹלָם, אֲשֶׁר קִדְּשָׁנוּ בְּמִצְוֹתָיו וְרַָצָה בָנוּ, וְשַׁבָּת קָדְשׁוֹ בְּאַהֲבָה וּבְרָצוֹן הִנְחִילָנוּ, זִכָּרוֹן לְמַעֲשֵׂה בְרֵאשִׁית. כִּי הוּא יוֹם תְּחִלָּה לְמִקְרָאֵי קֹדֶשׁ, זֵכֶר לִיצִיאַת מִצְרָיִם. כִּי בָנוּ בָחַרְתָּ וְאוֹתָנוּ קִדַּשְׁתָּ מִכָּל הָעַמִּים, וְשַׁבָּת קָדְשְׁךָ בְּאַהֲבָה וּבְרָצוֹן הִנְחַלְתָּנוּ. בָּרוּךְ אַתָּה יהוה מְקַדֵּשׁ הַשַׁבָּת.	Barukh ata Adonai Eloheinu, melekh ha'olam, asher kideshanu be'mitzvotav ve'ratza banu, ve'shabbat kodsho b'ahava uv'ratzon hinchilanu, zikaron l'ma'ase v'reshit. Ki hu yom t'chila l'mik'raei kodesh, zecher li'yziat mitzrayim. Ki vanu vacharta v'otanu kidashta mi'kol ha'amim, v'shabbat kodshecha b'ahava uv'ratzon hinchaltanu. Barukh ata Adonai m'kadesh hashabbat.	Blessed are You, Lord our God, King of the Universe, Who sanctified us with His commandments, and hoped for us, and with love and intent invested us with His sacred Sabbath, as a memorial to the deed of Creation. It is the first among the holy festivals, commemorating the exodus from Egypt. For You chose us, and sanctified us, out of all nations, and with love and intent You invested us with Your Holy Sabbath. Blessed are You, Adonai, Sanctifier of the Sabbath.
Main blessing of Havdalah (Ashkenazi)	בָּרוּךְ אַתָּה יהוה אֱלֹהֵינוּ מֶלֶךְ הָעוֹלָם, הַמַּבְדִּיל בֵּין קֹדֶשׁ לְחוֹל, בֵּין אוֹר לְחשֶׁךְ, בֵּין יִשְׂרָאֵל לָעַמִּים, בֵּין יוֹם הַשְּׁבִיעִי לְשֵׁשֶׁת יְמֵי הַמַּעֲשֶׂה: בָּרוּךְ אַתָּה יהוה, הַמַבְדִּיל בֵּין קֹדֶשׁ לְחוֹל:	Barukh ata Adonai Eloheinu, melekh ha'olam, ha'mavdil bein kodesh l'hol, bein or l'hoshekh, bein yisra'el la'amim, bein yom hash'vi'i l'sheshet y'mei hama'ase. Barukh ata Adonai, hamavdil bein kodesh l'ḥol.	Blessed are You, LORD our God, King of the universe, Who distinguishes between the sacred and the secular, between light and dark, between Israel and the nations, between the seventh day and the six days of labor. Blessed are You, LORD, Who distinguishes between the sacred and the secular.

=== Holiday blessings ===
When any of these blessings are done for the first time that year, the blessing of shehecheyanu is said.

Festival	Blessing	Hebrew	Transliteration	English
Rosh haShana	For blowing the shofar	בָּרוּךְ אַתָּה יהוה, אֱלֹהֵינוּּ מֶלֶךְ הָעוֹלָם, אֲשֶׁר קִדְּשָׁנוּ בְּמִצְוֹתָיו, וְצִוָּנוּ לִשְׁמֹעַ קוֹל שׁוֹפָר.	Barukh ata Adonai Eloheinu, melekh ha'olam, asher kid'shanu b'mitzvotav v'tzivanu lishmoa kol shofar.	Blessed are You, LORD our God, King of the universe, Who has sanctified us with His commandments and commanded us to hear the sound of the shofar.
Sukkot	For sitting in the sukkah for a meal	בָּרוּךְ אַתָּה יהוה, אֱלֹהֵינוּּ מֶלֶךְ הָעוֹלָם, אֲשֶׁר קִדְּשָׁנוּ בְּמִצְוֹתָיו, וְצִוָּנוּ לֵישֵׁב בַּסֻּכָּה.	Barukh ata Adonai Eloheinu, melekh ha'olam, asher kid'shanu b'mitzvotav v'tzivanu leishev basukah.	Blessed are You, LORD our God, King of the universe, Who has sanctified us with His commandments and commanded us to sit in the sukkah.
Pesach	For eating the matzah at the seder	בָּרוּךְ אַתָּה יהוה, אֱלֹהֵינוּּ מֶלֶךְ הָעוֹלָם, אֲשֶׁר קִדְּשָׁנוּ בְּמִצְוֹתָיו, וְצִוָּנוּ עַל אֲכִילַת מַצָּה.	Barukh ata Adonai Eloheinu, melekh ha'olam, asher kid'shanu b'mitzvotav v'tzivanu al achilat matzah.	Blessed are You, LORD our God, King of the universe, Who has sanctified us with His commandments and commanded us to eat matzah.
Pesach	For eating the maror at the seder	בָּרוּךְ אַתָּה יהוה, אֱלֹהֵינוּּ מֶלֶךְ הָעוֹלָם, אֲשֶׁר קִדְּשָׁנוּ בְּמִצְוֹתָיו, וְצִוָּנוּ עַל אֲכִילַת מָרוֹר.	Barukh ata Adonai Eloheinu, melekh ha'olam, asher kid'shanu b'mitzvotav v'tzivanu al achilat maror.	Blessed are You, LORD our God, King of the universe, Who has sanctified us with His commandments and commanded us to eat maror.
Sukkot	For taking the lulav	בָּרוּךְ אַתָּה יהוה, אֱלֹהֵינוּּ מֶלֶךְ הָעוֹלָם, אֲשֶׁר קִדְּשָׁנוּ בְּמִצְוֹתָיו, וְצִוָּנוּ עַל נְטִילַת לוּלָב.	Barukh ata Adonai Eloheinu, melekh ha'olam, asher kid'shanu b'mitzvotav v'tzivanu al netilat lulav.	Blessed are You, LORD our God, King of the universe, Who has sanctified us with His commandments and commanded us to take up the lulav.
Purim	For reading the megilla	בָּרוּךְ אַתָּה יהוה, אֱלֹהֵינוּּ מֶלֶךְ הָעוֹלָם, אֲשֶׁר קִדְּשָׁנוּ בְּמִצְוֹתָיו, וְצִוָּנוּ עַל מִקְרָא מְגִלָּה.	Barukh ata Adonai Eloheinu, melekh ha'olam, asher kid'shanu b'mitzvotav v'tzivanu al mikra megilla.	Blessed are You, LORD our God, King of the universe, Who has sanctified us with His commandments and commanded us to read the megilla.
Hanukkah	For the lighting the candles	בָּרוּךְ אַתָּה יהוה, אֱלֹהֵינוּּ מֶלֶךְ הָעוֹלָם, אֲשֶׁר קִדְּשָׁנוּ בְּמִצְוֹתָיו, וְצִוָּנוּ לְהַדְלִיק נֵר שֶׁל חֲנֻכָּה.	Barukh ata Adonai Eloheinu, melekh ha'olam, asher kid'shanu b'mitzvotav v'tzivanu l'hadlik ner shel Hanukkah.	Blessed are You, LORD our God, King of the universe, Who has sanctified us with His commandments and commanded us to kindle the Hanukkah light[s].
Hanukkah, Purim	Remembering the miracle of the day (said following the appropriate blessing above)	בָּרוּךְ אַתָּה יהוה אֱלֹהֵינוּּ מֶלֶךְ הָעוֹלָם, שֶׁעָשָׂה נִסִּים לַאֲבוֹתֵֽינוּ בַּיָּמִים הָהֵם בַּזְּמַן הַזֶּה.	Barukh ata Adonai Eloheinu, melekh ha'olam, she'asa nisim la'avoteinu ba'yamim ha'heim ba'z'man ha'ze.	Blessed are You, LORD our God, King of the universe, Who performed miracles for our ancestors in those days at this time...

=== Mitzvot not associated with festivals ===
Occasion	Hebrew	Transliteration	English
Putting on tzitzit	בָּרוּךְ אַתָּה יהוה אֱלֹהֵינוּּ, מֶלֶךְ הָעוֹלָם. אֲשֶר קִדְּשָנוּ בְּמִצְוֹתָיו וִצִוָּנוּ עַל־מִצְוַת צִיצִת.	Barukh ata Adonai Eloheinu, melekh ha`olam, asher kid'shanu b'mitzvotav, al-mitzvat tzitzit.	Blessed are You, LORD our God, King of the universe, Who has sanctified us with His commandments, and commanded us regarding the commandment of fringes.
Putting on tallit (prayer shawl)	בָּרוּךְ אַתָּה יהוה אֱלֹהֵינוּּ מֶלֶךְ הָעוֹלָם, אֲשֶר קִדְּשָׁנוּ בְּמִצְוֹתָיו וְצִוָּנוּ לְהִתְעַטֵּף בַּצִיצִית	Barukh ata Adonai Eloheinu, melekh ha'olam, asher kid'shanu b'mitzvotav v'tzivanu l'hit'atef ba'tzitzit	Blessed are You, LORD our God, King of the universe, Who has sanctified us with His commandments and has commanded us to wrap ourselves with fringes.
Putting on tefillin	בָּרוּךְ אַתָּה יהוה אֱלֹהֵינוּּ מֶלֶךְ הָעוֹלָם, אֲשֶׁר קִדְּשָׁנוּ בְּמִצְוֹתָיו וְצִוָּנוּ לְהָנִיחַ תְּפִלִּין.	Barukh ata Adonai Eloheinu, melekh ha`olam, asher kid'shanu b'mitzvotav v'tzivanu l'hani'aḥ t'filin.	Blessed are You, LORD our God, King of the universe, Who has sanctified us with His commandments and has commanded us to put on tefillin.
Putting on the head tefillin (Ashkenazim and some Italians only)	בָּרוּךְ אַתָּה יהוה אֱלֹהֵינוּּ מֶלֶךְ הָעוֹלָם, אֲשֶׁר קִדְּשָׁנוּ בְּמִצְוֹתָיו וְצִוָּנוּ עַל מִצְוַת תְּפִלִּין. It is customary to add after the Tefillin are on properly: בָּרוּךְ שֵׁם כְּבוֹד מַלְכוּתוֹ לְעוֹלָם וָעֶד.	Barukh ata Adonai Eloheinu, melekh ha'olam, asher kid'shanu b'mitzvotav v'tzivanu al mitzvat t'filin It is customary to add after the Tefillin are on properly: Barukh shem k'vod malkhuto l'olam va'ed	Blessed are You, LORD our God, King of the universe, Who has sanctified us with His commandments and has commanded us regarding the commandment of tefillin. It is customary to add after the Tefillin are on properly: Blessed is the Name of His glorious kingdom for ever and ever.
When affixing a mezuzah on the door	בָּרוּךְ אַתָּה יהוה אֱלֹהֵינוּּ מֶלֶךְ הָעוֹלָם, אֲשֶׁר קִדְּשָׁנוּ בְּמִצְוֹתָיו וְצִוָּנוּ לִקְבּוֹעַ מְזוּזָה.	Barukh ata Adonai Eloheinu, melekh ha'olam, asher kid'shanu b'mitzvotav v'tzivanu likboa m'zuza.	Blessed are You, LORD our God, King of the universe, Who has sanctified us with His commandments and commanded us to affix the mezuzah.
When immersing in a mikveh, either for conversion or niddah.	בָּרוּךְ אַתָּה יהוה, אֱלֹהֵינוּּ מֶלֶךְ הָעוֹלָם, אֲשֶׁר קִדְּשָׁנוּ בְּמִצְוֹתָיו, וְצִוָּנוּ עַל הַטְּבִילָה.	Barukh ata Adonai Eloheinu, melekh ha'olam, asher kid'shanu b'mitzvotav v'tzivanu al ha't'vila.	Blessed are You, LORD our God, King of the universe, Who has sanctified us with His commandments and commanded us concerning immersion.
When immersing vessels in a mikveh.	בָּרוּךְ אַתָּה יהוה, אֱלֹהֵינוּּ מֶלֶךְ הָעוֹלָם, אֲשֶׁר קִדְּשָׁנוּ בְּמִצְוֹתָיו, וְצִוָּנוּ עַל טְבִילַת כֵּלִים (כֶּלִי).	Barukh ata Adonai Eloheinu, melekh ha'olam, asher kid'shanu b'mitzvotav v'tzivanu al t'vilat kelim.	Blessed are You, LORD our God, King of the universe, Who has sanctified us with His commandments and commanded us concerning the immersion of vessels.

== Blessings on pleasures, sights and sounds ==
=== Blessings during a meal ===
==== N'tilat Yadayim (Ritual washing of hands) ====
The hands are ritually washed before partaking of certain staples of life. This is done before eating bread. In some Ashkenazic (especially German or Hungarian communities) at the Sabbath or festive meal, it is done before kiddush.

In most communities, the blessing is recited after washing but before drying the hands. Some recite the blessing after filling up the washing cup, right before pouring the water on the hands.

Hebrew	Transliteration	English
בָּרוּךְ אַתָּה יהוה, אֱלֹהֵינוּּ מֶלֶךְ הָעוֹלָם, אֲשֶׁר קִדְּשָׁנוּ בּמִצְוֹתָיו, וצִוָּנוּ עַל נְטִילַת יָדָיִם.	Barukh ata Adonai Elohenu, melekh ha`olam, asher kid'shanu b'mitzvotav v'tzivanu `al netilat yadayim.	Blessed are You, LORD our God, King of the universe, Who has sanctified us with His commandments and commanded us concerning the taking (drying) of hands.

==== Blessing prior to food ====
Blessing	Said for	Hebrew	Transliteration	English
Hamotzi	Bread made from one or all of: wheat, barley, rye, oats, spelt.	בָּרוּךְ אַתָּה יהוה, אֱלֹהֵינוּּ מֶלֶךְ הָעוֹלָם, הַמּוֹצִיא לֶחֶם מִן הָאָרֶץ.	Barukh ata Adonai Eloheinu, melekh ha'olam, hamotzi lehem min ha'aretz.	Blessed are You, LORD our God, King of the universe, Who brings forth bread from the earth.
Mezonot	Non-bread (e.g. cake) products of wheat, barley, rye, oats, spelt (and rice, according to many opinions).	בָּרוּךְ אַתָּה יהוה, אֱלֹהֵינוּּ מֶלֶךְ הָעוֹלָם, בּוֹרֵא מִינֵי מְזוֹנוֹת.	Barukh ata Adonai Eloheinu, Melekh ha'olam, borei minei m'zonot.	Blessed are You, LORD our God, King of the universe, Who creates varieties of nourishment.
HaGafen	Wine made from grapes, or grape juice. Not said for any other drink or any other grape-based product.	בָּרוּךְ אַתָּה יהוה, אֱלֹהֵינוּּ מֶלֶךְ הָעוֹלָם, בּוֹרֵא פְּרִי הַגֶּפֶן (הַגָּפַן).	Barukh ata Adonai Eloheinu, Melekh ha'olam, borei p'ri hagefen (ha-gafen).	Blessed are You, LORD our God, King of the universe, Who creates the fruit of the vine.
HaʿEtz	Any fruit from trees.	בָּרוּךְ אַתָּה יהוה, אֱלֹהֵינוּּ מֶלֶךְ הָעוֹלָם, בּוֹרֵא פְּרִי הָעֵץ.	Barukh ata Adonai Eloheinu, Melekh ha'olam, borei p'ri ha'etz.	Blessed are You, LORD our God, King of the universe, Who creates the fruit of the tree.
HaʾAdama	Produce that grew directly from the earth.	בָּרוּךְ אַתָּה יהוה אֱלֹהֵינוּּ מֶלֶךְ הָעוֹלָם בּוֹרֵא פְּרִי הָאֲדָמָה.	Barukh ata Adonai Eloheinu, Melekh ha`olam, borei p'ri ha'adama.	Blessed are You, LORD our God, King of the universe, Who creates the fruit of the ground.
Shehakol	Any foods or drinks not in the first five categories.	בָּרוּךְ אַתָּה יהוה אֱלֹהֵינוּּ מֶלֶךְ הָעוֹלָם שֶׁהַכֹּל נִהְיָּה (נִהְיֶּה) בִּדְבָרוֹ.	Barukh ata Adonai Eloheinu, Melekh ha'olam, shehakol nih'ya (nih'ye) bidvaro.	Blessed are You, LORD our God, King of the universe, through Whose word everything comes into being.

==== After the meal ====
The combined blessing of Birkat Hamazon is made only after eating a meal containing bread (including matza) made from one or all of wheat, barley, rye, oats, spelt.

After Birkat Hamazon, many Sephardic Jews of the Spanish and Portuguese rite recite Ya Comimos or sing Bendigamos. These prayers are similar in content to Birkat Hamazon.

=== Blessings for smells ===
Said for	Hebrew	Transliteration	English
Pleasant smelling trees and shrubs	בָּרוּךְ אַתָּה יהוה, אֱלֹהֵינוּּ מֶלֶךְ הָעוֹלָם, בּוֹרֵא עֲצֵי בְשָׂמִים.	Barukh ata Adonai Eloheinu, melekh ha'olam, bore atzei b'samim	Blessed are You, LORD our God, King of the universe, Who creates fragrant trees.
Pleasant smelling grasses herbs or flowers	בָּרוּךְ אַתָּה יהוה, אֱלֹהֵינוּּ מֶלֶךְ הָעוֹלָם, בּוֹרֵא עִשְּׂבֵי בְשָׂמִים.	Barukh ata Adonai Eloheinu, melekh ha'olam, bore issvei b'samim	Blessed are You, LORD our God, King of the universe, Who creates fragrant grasses.
Pleasant smelling fruits	בָּרוּךְ אַתָּה יהוה, אֱלֹהֵינוּּ מֶלֶךְ הָעוֹלָם, הַנוֹתֵן רֵיחַ טוֹב בַּפֵּרוֹת.	Barukh ata Adonai Eloheinu, melekh ha'olam, hanoten reaḥ tov bapeirot	Blessed are You, LORD our God, King of the universe, Who gives pleasant smells to fruit.
Pleasant smelling oils	בָּרוּךְ אַתָּה יהוה, אֱלֹהֵינוּּ מֶלֶךְ הָעוֹלָם, בּוֹרֵא שֶׁמֶן עָרֵב.	Barukh ata Adonai Eloheinu, melekh ha'olam, bore shemen arev	Blessed are You, LORD our God, King of the universe, Who creates pleasing perfumes.
All other smells	בָּרוּךְ אַתָּה יהוה, אֱלֹהֵינוּּ מֶלֶךְ הָעוֹלָם, בּוֹרֵא מִינֵי בְשָׂמִים.	Barukh ata Adonai Eloheinu, melekh ha'olam, bore minei b'samim	Blessed are You, LORD our God, King of the universe, Who creates various spices.

=== Blessings on sights and sounds ===
Said for	Hebrew	Transliteration	English
Seeing wonders of nature, lightning	בָּרוּךְ אַתָּה יהוה, אֱלֹהֵינוּּ מֶלֶךְ הָעוֹלָם, עוֹשֶׂה מַעֲשֵׂה בְרֵאשִׁית.	Barukh ata Adonai Eloheinu, melekh ha'olam, oseh ma'ase v'reshit	Blessed are You, LORD our God, King of the universe, Who makes all creation.
Hearing thunder	בָּרוּךְ אַתָּה יהוה, אֱלֹהֵינוּּ מֶלֶךְ הָעוֹלָם, שֶׁכֹּחוֹ וּגְבוּרָתוֹ מָלַא עוֹלָם.	Barukh ata Adonai Eloheinu, melekh ha'olam, shekoho ug'vurato maleh olam	Blessed are You, LORD our God, King of the universe, Whose power and strength fill the world.
Seeing a rainbow	בָּרוּךְ אַתָּה יהוה, אֱלֹהֵינוּּ מֶלֶךְ הָעוֹלָם, זוֹכֵר הַבְּרִית וְנֶאֱמָן בִּבְרִיתוֹ וְקַיָם בְּמַאֲמָרוֹ.	Barukh ata Adonai Eloheinu, melekh ha'olam, zocher habrit v'ne'eman bivrito v'kayam b'ma'amaro	Blessed are You, LORD our God, King of the universe, Who remembers the covenant and who is trustworthy in his covenants and fulfills His word.
Seeing the ocean or large body of water for the first time in 30 days	בָּרוּךְ אַתָּה יהוה, אֱלֹהֵינוּּ מֶלֶךְ הָעוֹלָם, שֶׁעָשָׂה אֶת הַיָם הַגָּדוֹל.	Barukh ata Adonai Eloheinu, melekh ha'olam, she'asa et hayam hagadol	Blessed are You, LORD our God, King of the universe, Who made the large bodies of water.
Seeing trees blossom for the first time in the spring	בָּרוּךְ אַתָּה יהוה, אֱלֹהֵינוּּ מֶלֶךְ הָעוֹלָם, שֶׁלֹּא חִסַּר בְּעוֹלָמוֹ כְּלוּם וּבָרָא בוֹ בְּרִיוֹת טוֹבוֹת וְאִילָנוֹת טוֹבִים לְהַנּוֹת בָּהֶם בְּנֵי אָדָם.	Barukh ata Adonai Eloheinu, melekh ha'olam, shelo chisar b'olamo klum uvara vo b'riyot tovot v'ilanot tovim l'hanot bahem b'nei adam	Blessed are You, LORD our God, King of the universe, Who left out nothing in His world and created pleasant creations and good trees so that people can derive benefit from them.
Seeing people or creatures who are very special/unique in their appearance	בָּרוּךְ אַתָּה יהוה אֱלֹהֵינוּ מֶלֶךְ הָעוֹלָם מְשַנֶּה הַבְּרִיּוֹת	Barukh ata Adonai Eloheinu, melekh ha'olam, Meshane habriyot	Blessed are You, LORD our God, King of the universe, changer of creations.

== Blessings on special occasions ==
Name	Hebrew	Transliteration	English	Occasion
Shehecheyanu	בָּרוּךְ אַתָּה יהוה אֱלֹהֵינוּּ מֶלֶךְ הַעוֹלָם, שֶׁהֶחֱיָנוּ וְקִיְּמָנוּ וְהִגִּיעָנוּ לַזְּמַן הַזֶּה	Baruch atah Adonai Elohenu, melekh ha'olam, shehecheyanu vekiymanu vehigi'anu lazman hazeh.	Blessed are You, Lord, our God, King of the Universe, who has granted us life, sustained us, and enabled us to reach this occasion.	For positive new experiences, including the first time a mitzvah is being done, new clothes or a new annual fruit.
Hatov v'hametiv	בָּרוּךְ אַתָּה יהוה אֱלֹהֵינוּּ מֶלֶךְ הַעוֹלָם, הַטוֹב וְהַמֵטִיב׃	Baruch atah Adonai Elohenu, melekh ha'olam, hatov v'hametiv.	Blessed are You, Lord, our God, King of the Universe, who is good and does good.	For good news and positive experiences.
Dayan ha'emet	בָּרוּךְ אַתָּה יהוה אֱלֹהֵינוּּ מֶלֶךְ הַעוֹלָם, דָיַן הַאֱמֶת׃	Baruch atah Adonai Elohenu, melekh ha'olam, dayan ha'emet.	Blessed are You, Lord, our God, King of the Universe, the just judge.	For bad news and negative experiences. Also said at a funeral by the mourners prior to tearing the clothes.
Hagomel	בָּרוּךְ אַתָּה יהוה, אֱלֹהֵינוּּ מֶלֶךְ הָעוֹלָם, הַגּוֹמֵל לַחַיָּבִים טוֹבוֹת שֶׁגְּמָלַנִי כָּל טוֹב.	Barukh ata Adonai Eloheinu, melekh ha'olam, hagomel lahayavim tovot, sheg'molani kol tov.	Blessed are You, LORD our God, King of the Universe, Who bestows good things upon the unworthy, and has bestowed upon me every goodness.	For surviving life-threatening situations, such as illness or childbirth.

== Holiday Additions ==
Name	Hebrew	English	Occasion
Yaaleh V'Yavo	אֱלֹהֵֽינוּ וֵאלֹהֵי אֲבוֹתֵֽינוּ יַעֲלֶה וְיָבֹא וְיַגִּֽיעַ וְיֵרָאֶה וְיֵרָצֶה וְיִשָּׁמַע וְיִפָּקֵד וְיִזָּכֵר זִכְרוֹנֵֽנוּ וּפִקְדוֹנֵֽנוּ וְזִכְרוֹן אֲבוֹתֵֽינוּ. וְזִכְרוֹן מָשִֽׁיחַ בֶּן דָּוִד עַבְדֶּֽךָ. וְזִכְרוֹן יְרוּשָׁלַֽיִם עִיר קָדְשֶֽׁךָ. וְזִכְרוֹן כָּל עַמְּ֒ךָ בֵּית יִשְׂרָאֵל לְפָנֶֽיךָ. לִפְלֵיטָה לְטוֹבָה לְחֵן וּלְחֶֽסֶד וּלְרַחֲמִים לְחַיִּים וּלְשָׁלוֹם. בְּיוֹם לר"ח: רֹאשׁ הַחֹֽדֶשׁ הַזֶּה: לפסח: חַג הַמַּצּוֹת הַזֶּה: לסכות: חַג הַסֻּכּוֹת הַזֶּה: זָכְרֵֽנוּ יְהֹוָה אֱלֹהֵֽינוּ בּוֹ לְטוֹבָה. וּפָקְדֵֽנוּ בוֹ לִבְרָכָה. וְהוֹשִׁיעֵֽנוּ בוֹ לְחַיִּים. וּבִדְבַר יְשׁוּעָה וְרַחֲמִים חוּס וְחָנֵּֽנוּ וְרַחֵם עָלֵֽינוּ וְהוֹשִׁיעֵֽנוּ. כִּי אֵלֶֽיךָ עֵינֵֽינוּ כִּי אֵל מֶֽלֶךְ חַנּוּן וְרַחוּם אָֽתָּה:	Our God and God of our fathers, may there ascend, come, and reach, appear, be desired, and heard, counted and recalled our remembrance and reckoning; the remembrance of our fathers; the remembrance of the Messiah the son of David, Your servant; the remembrance of Jerusalem, city of Your Sanctuary and the remembrance of Your entire people, the House of Israel, before You for survival, for well-being, for favor, kindliness, compassion, for life and peace on this day of the: Rosh Chodesh/Festival of Matzos/Festival of Sukkos. Remember us Adonoy, our God, on this day for well-being; be mindful of us on this day for blessing, and deliver us for life. In accord with the promise of deliverance and compassion, spare us and favor us, have compassion on us and deliver us; for our eyes are directed to You, because You are the Almighty Who is King, Gracious, and Merciful.	Major festivals, Rosh Chodesh, and Chol HaMoed
Al HaNissim	עַל הַנִּסִּים וְעַל הַפֻּרְקָן וְעַל הַגְּ֒בוּרוֹת וְעַל הַתְּ֒שׁוּעוֹת וְעַל הַמִּלְחָמוֹת שֶׁעָשִֽׂיתָ לַאֲבוֹתֵֽינוּ בַּיָּמִים הָהֵם בִּזְּ֒מַן הַזֶּה:	[We thank You] for the miracles, for the redemption, for the mighty deeds, for the deliverances and for the wars that You performed for our fathers in those days at this season.	Chanukah/Purim
B'Yimei Matityahu	בִּימֵי מַתִּתְיָֽהוּ בֶּן יוֹחָנָן כֹּהֵן גָּדוֹל חַשְׁמוֹנָאִי וּבָנָיו כְּשֶׁעָמְ֒דָה מַלְכוּת יָוָן הָרְ֒שָׁעָה עַל־עַמְּ֒ךָ יִשְׂרָאֵל לְהַשְׁכִּיחָם תּוֹרָתֶֽךָ וּלְהַעֲבִירָם מֵחֻקֵּי רְצוֹנֶֽךָ, וְאַתָּה בְּרַחֲמֶֽיךָ הָרַבִּים עָמַֽדְתָּ לָהֶם בְּעֵת צָרָתָם רַֽבְתָּ אֶת־רִיבָם דַּֽנְתָּ אֶת־דִּינָם נָקַֽמְתָּ אֶת־נִקְמָתָם מָסַֽרְתָּ גִבּוֹרִים בְּיַד חַלָּשִׁים וְרַבִּים בְּיַד מְעַטִּים וּטְמֵאִים בְּיַד טְהוֹרִים וּרְשָׁעִים בְּיַד צַדִּיקִים וְזֵדִים בְּיַד עוֹסְ֒קֵי תוֹרָתֶֽךָ וּלְךָ עָשִֽׂיתָ שֵׁם גָּדוֹל וְקָדוֹשׁ בְּעוֹלָמֶֽךָ וּלְעַמְּ֒ךָ יִשְׂרָאֵל עָשִֽׂיתָ תְּשׁוּעָה גְדוֹלָה וּפֻרְקָן כְּהַיּוֹם הַזֶּה וְאַחַר־כֵּן בָּֽאוּ בָנֶֽיךָ לִדְבִיר בֵּיתֶֽךָ וּפִנּוּ אֶת־הֵיכָלֶֽךָ וְטִהֲרוּ אֶת־מִקְדָּשֶֽׁךָ וְהִדְלִֽיקוּ נֵרוֹת בְּחַצְרוֹת קָדְשֶֽׁךָ וְקָבְ֒עוּ שְׁמוֹנַת יְמֵי חֲנֻכָּה אֵֽלּוּ לְהוֹדוֹת וּלְהַלֵּל לְשִׁמְךָ הַגָּדוֹל:	In the days of Matisyahu, son of Yochanan the High Priest, the Hasmonean and his sons, when the evil Greek kingdom rose up against Your people Israel to make them forget Your Torah and to turn them away from the statutes of Your will— You, in Your abundant mercy, stood by them in their time of distress, You defended their cause, You judged their grievances, You avenged them. You delivered the mighty into the hands of the weak, many into the hands of the few, defiled people into the hands of the undefiled, the wicked into the hands of the righteous, and insolent [sinners] into the hands of diligent students of Your Torah. And You made Yourself a great and sanctified name in Your world. And for Your people, Israel, You performed a great deliverance and redemption unto this very day. Afterwards, Your sons entered the Holy of Holies of Your Abode, cleaned Your Temple, purified Your Sanctuary, and kindled lights in the Courtyards of Your Sanctuary, and designated these eight days of Chanukah to thank and praise Your great Name.	Chanuka
B'Yimei Mordechai	בִּימֵי מָרְדְּ֒כַי וְאֶסְתֵּר בְּשׁוּשַׁן הַבִּירָה כְּשֶׁעָמַד עֲלֵיהֶם הָמָן הָרָשָׁע בִּקֵּשׁ לְהַשְׁמִיד לַהֲרוֹג וּלְאַבֵּד אֶת־כָּל־הַיְּ֒הוּדִים מִנַּֽעַר וְעַד־זָקֵן טַף וְנָשִׁים בְּיוֹם אֶחָד בִּשְׁלוֹשָׁה עָשָׂר לְחֹֽדֶשׁ שְׁנֵים־עָשָׂר הוּא־חֹֽדֶשׁ אֲדָר וּשְׁלָלָם לָבוֹז: וְאַתָּה בְּרַחֲמֶֽיךָ הָרַבִּים הֵפַֽרְתָּ אֶת־עֲצָתוֹ וְקִלְקַֽלְתָּ אֶת־מַחֲשַׁבְתּוֹ וַהֲשֵׁבֽוֹתָ לּוֹ גְּמוּלוֹ בְּרֹאשׁוֹ וְתָלוּ אוֹתוֹ וְאֶת־בָּנָיו עַל־הָעֵץ (וְעָשִׂיתָ עמָּהֶם נֵס וָפֶלֶא וְנוֹדֶה לְשִׁמְךָ הָגָּדוֹל סֶלָה):	In the days of Mordechai and Esther in Shushan the Capital [of Persia], when the evil Haman rose up against them, he sought to destroy, to kill, and to annihilate all the Jews, young and old, infants and women, in one day, the thirteenth day of the twelfth month, which is the month of Adar, and to plunder their wealth— And You, in Your abundant mercy, annulled his counsel, frustrated his intention, and brought his evil plan upon his own head, and they hanged him and his sons upon the gallows. And You made a miracle and a wonder for them, and we are thankful to Your great name forever.	Purim

== See also ==
- Berakhah
- Birkat Hachama
- Shuckling
- Siddur
