= Havineinu =

Blessing from the Amidah

Havineinu or Habinenu (Hebrew: הביננו) is a blessing from the Amidah, the central prayer of the Jewish liturgy. It is a condensed version of the middle 13 blessings of the Amidah, recited in places of those 13 blessings when time or circumstances call for a shorter prayer.

== Etymology ==
The word havineinu literally means 'cause us to understand', and comes from a Hebrew verb used in Tanakh and Talmud.

== Sources ==
The Mishnah discusses saying a shortened Amidah, but does not give a specific text:

Rabban Gamaliel says: every day one prays eighteen [blessings]. Rabbi Joshua says: an abridgment of eighteen [blessings]. Rabbi Akiva says: if he knows his prayer fluently then he prays eighteen [blessings], but if he doesn't know then an abridgment of eighteen [blessings].

While the Mishnah can be read to say that all 18 blessings of Amidah are shortened, the Babylonian Talmud mentions that only the middle blessings are shortened, but the initial 3 blessings and final 3 blessings are full. The Babylonian Talmud gives the precise text of the single blessing which replaces the middle blessings:

Rabbi Yehoshua says: an abridgment of eighteen [blessings]. What is the "abridgment of eighteen"? Rav said: an abridgment of each and every blessing. However Shmuel said: "Give us knowledge (Hebrew: Havineinu), the Lord, our God, to know Your ways, and circumcise our heart so that we may fear You, and forgive us so that we may be redeemed, and distance us from our diseases, and satisfy us with the pastures of Your land, and gather our scattered Jews from the four [corners of the earth], and those who go astray shall be judged according to Your will, and raise Your hands over the wicked, and may the righteous rejoice in the rebuilding of Your city, and the restoration of Your Sanctuary, and in the flourishing of Your servant David, and in establishing a torching light for Your King, son of Jesse. Even before we call, but You already answer. Blessed are You, the Lord, Who listens the prayer."

== Text ==
Blessing of Amidah	English	Hebrew
4	Give us knowledge, the Lord, our God, to know Your ways,	הֲבִינֵנוּ יְהֹוָה אֱלֹהֵינוּ לָדַעַת דְּרָכֶיךָ
5	and circumcise our heart, so that we may fear You,	וּמוֹל אֶת לְבָבֵנוּ לְיִרְאָתֶךָ
6	and forgive us	וְתִסְלַח לָנוּ
7	so that we may be redeemed,	לִהְיוֹת גְּאוּלִים
8	and distance us from our diseases,	וְרַחֲקֵנוּ מִמַּכְאוֹבֵינוּ
9	and satisfy us with the pastures of Your land,	וְדַשְּׁנֵנוּ בִּנְאוֹת אַרְצֶךָ
10	and gather our scattered Jews from the four [corners of the earth],	וּנְפוּצוֹתֵינוּ מֵאַרְבַּע תְּקַבֵּץ
11	and those who go astray shall be judged according to Your will,	וְהַתּוֹעִים עַל דַּעְתְּךָ יִשָּׁפֵטוּ
12	and raise Your hands over the wicked,	וְעַל הָרְשָׁעִים תָּנִיף יָדֶיךָ
13, 14, 15	and may the righteous rejoice in the rebuilding of Your city, and the restoration of Your Sanctuary, and in the flourishing of Your servant David, and in establishing a torching light for Your King, son of Jesse.	וְיִשְׂמְחוּ צַדִּיקִים בְּבִנְיַן עִירֶךָ וּבְתִקּוּן הֵיכָלֶךָ וּבִצְמִיחַת קֶרֶן לְדָוִד עַבְדֶּךָ וּבַעֲרִיכַת נֵר לְבֶן יִשַׁי מְשִׁיחֶךָ
16	Even before we call, but You already answer. Blessed are You, the Lord, Who listens to prayer.	טֶרֶם נִקרָא אַתָּה תַעֲנֶה בָּרוּךְ אַתָּה יְהֹוָה שׁוֹמֵעַ תְּפִלָּה
