= Divine mercy =

Attribute of God

Divine mercy or God's mercy is an attribute of God in Christianity, in Judaism, and in Islam.

== Words ==
The words used in the Bible in Hebrew to designate mercy, including divine mercy, are rakham (Exodus 34:6; Isaiah 55:7), khanan (Deut. 4:31) and khesed (Nehemiah 9:32).

In the Greek of the New Testament and of the Septuagint, the word most commonly used to designate mercy, including divine mercy, is eleos.

The Arabic word used in Islam to refer to divine mercy is raḥma.

== Views ==
=== Christianity and Judaism ===
In Christianity and Judaism, it is believed that God chooses to be merciful and is not obliged to act as such.

In Christianity, it is believed that it is through his action that God reveals his mercy. Divine mercy is appealed to in Christian repentances.

In the Catholic Church, God's mercy is seen as the "universal root" of all of God's acts: divine mercy is the cause of all actions God accomplishes outside of himself. The Catechism of the Catholic Church states that "[t]he Gospel is the revelation in Jesus Christ of God's mercy to sinners", and that "[t]here are no limits to the mercy of God, but anyone who deliberately refuses to accept his mercy by repenting, rejects the forgiveness of his sins and the salvation offered by the Holy Spirit".

=== Islam ===
In Islam, God's mercy is designated by the Arabic term raḥma. One of the names of God in Islam is al-raḥmān and al-raḥīm ("the Compassionate" and "the Merciful"). In Islam, portions of God's mercy are considered as being within all the world (and not only in humanity).

== See also ==
- Divine Mercy (Catholic devotion)
- Will of God
- Divine wrath
