= Birkat Hachama =

Jewish blessing, thanking God for creating the sun

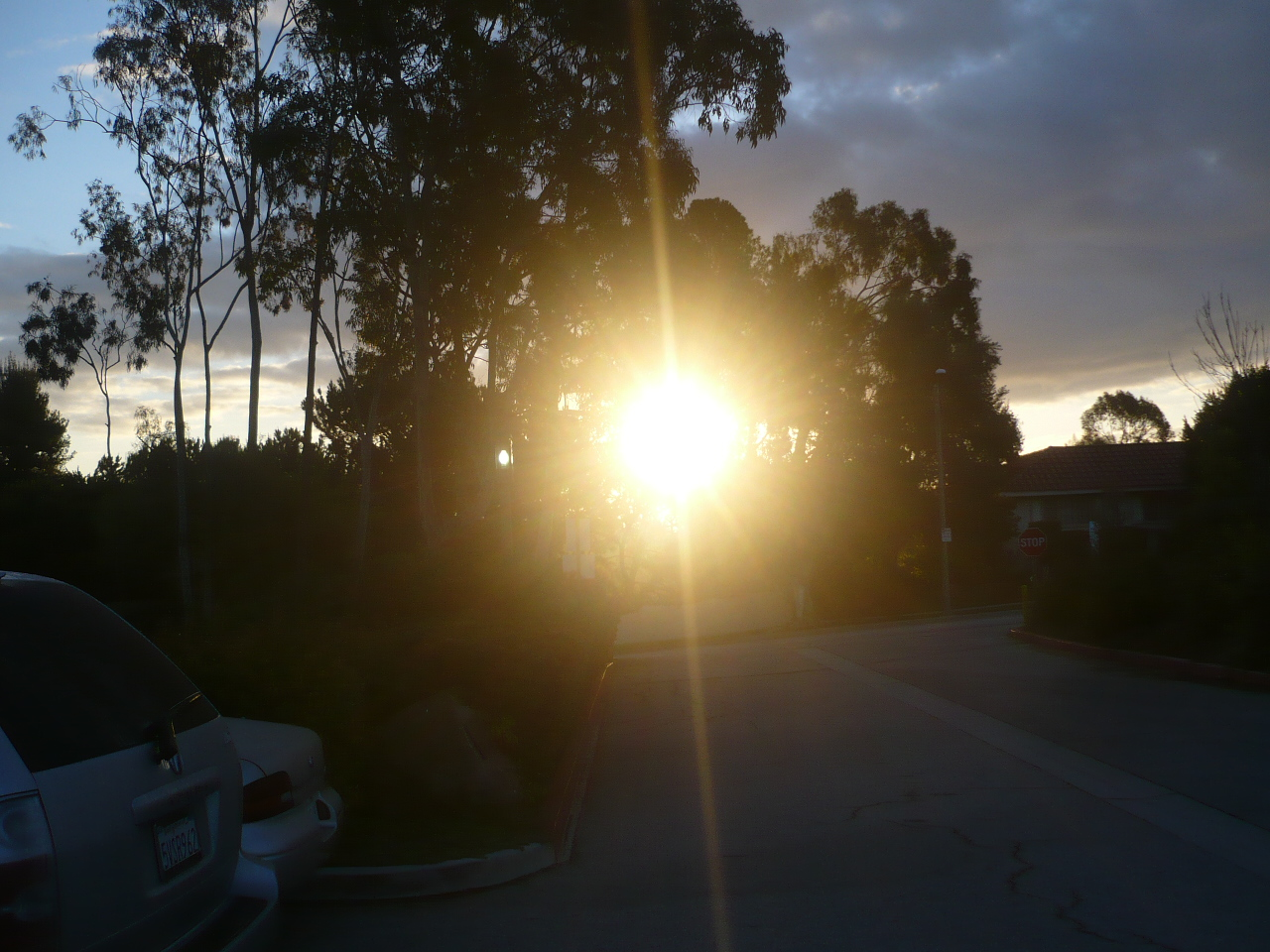
- Sunrise in Bel-Air, California on Wednesday, April 8, 2009, the date of Birkat Hachama
- Official name: Hebrew: ברכת החמה (Birkat Hachammah or Birkas Hachoma). Translation: "Blessing of the Sun"
- Observed by: Jews
- Type: Jewish
- Significance: Traditionally, the coincidence of the Sun's return to its location during the Creation of the world at the time of the week at which it was created
- Observances: Recitation of blessing, along with various Sun-related biblical texts, while outdoors and in the presence of the Sun
- Begins: Wednesday April 8th, every 28 years, dawn
- Ends: Third hour of the day
- Frequency: every 28 years (next occurrence: April 8, 2037)

Birkat Hachama (Hebrew: ברכת החמה, "Blessing of the Sun") refers to a rare Jewish blessing that is recited to the Creator, thanking God for creating the sun. The blessing is recited when the Sun completes its cycle every 28 years on a Tuesday at sundown. Jewish tradition says that when the Sun completes this cycle, it has returned to its position when the world was created. Because the blessing needs to be said when the Sun is visible, the blessing is postponed to the following day, on Wednesday morning.

According to Judaism, the Sun has a 28-year solar cycle known as machzor gadol (מחזור גדול, "the great cycle"). A solar year is estimated as 365.25 days and the "Blessing of the Sun", being said at the beginning of this cycle, is thus recited every 10,227 (28 times 365.25) days. The last time that it was recited was on April 8, 2009 (14 Nisan 5769 on the Hebrew calendar.)

From an astronomical point of view, there is nothing special to these dates; e.g. the Sun, Moon, planets and stars will not be aligned in any specific pattern. The text of the blessing itself is as follows:

ברוך אתה ה' אלהינו מלך העולם עושה מעשה בראשית Blessed are You, LORD, our God, King of the Universe who made the works of creation.

== Source of the practice ==
The primary source for the institution of Birkat Hachama is a Beraita mentioned in the Talmud:

תנו רבנן הרואה חמה בתקופתה...אומר ברוך עושה מעשה בראשית Our rabbis taught: "One who sees the sun at its turning point...recites the blessing of the maker of works of creation."

The middle of this clause in the beraita (elided here) speaks of other astronomical phenomena, the interpretation of which is ambiguous. The Gemara clarifies when the 'turning point' (תקופה) mentioned in the beraita occurs:

ואימת הוי אמר אביי כל כ״ח שנין And when does this happen? Abaye answers: every 28 years...

Next, the gemara explains the basis of the 28 years:

והדר מחזור ונפלה תקופת ניסן בשבתאי באורתא דתלת נגהי ארבע ...when the cycle renews and the "season of Nisan" (i.e. vernal equinox) falls in Saturn, on the evening of Tuesday going into Wednesday.

This explanation provided by Abaye is based on a ruling of Shmuel also mentioned in the Talmud:

Shmuel stated: The vernal equinox occurs only at the beginning of one of the four quarters of the day, either at the beginning of the day or at the beginning of the night, or midday or midnight. The summer solstice only occurs either at the end of 1.5 or at the end of 7.5 hours of the day or the night. The autumnal equinox only occurs at the end of 3 or 9 hours of the day or the night. The winter solstice only occurs at the end of 4.5 or 10.5 hours of the day or the night. The duration of a season of the year is no longer than 91 days and 7.5 hours.

Shmuel's calculations, however, are imprecise because the Earth does not travel around the Sun with a constant speed. His imprecision, according to Abraham ibn Ezra, was a function of the desire of the time to avoid the necessity of manipulating fractions.

== Codification in Jewish law ==
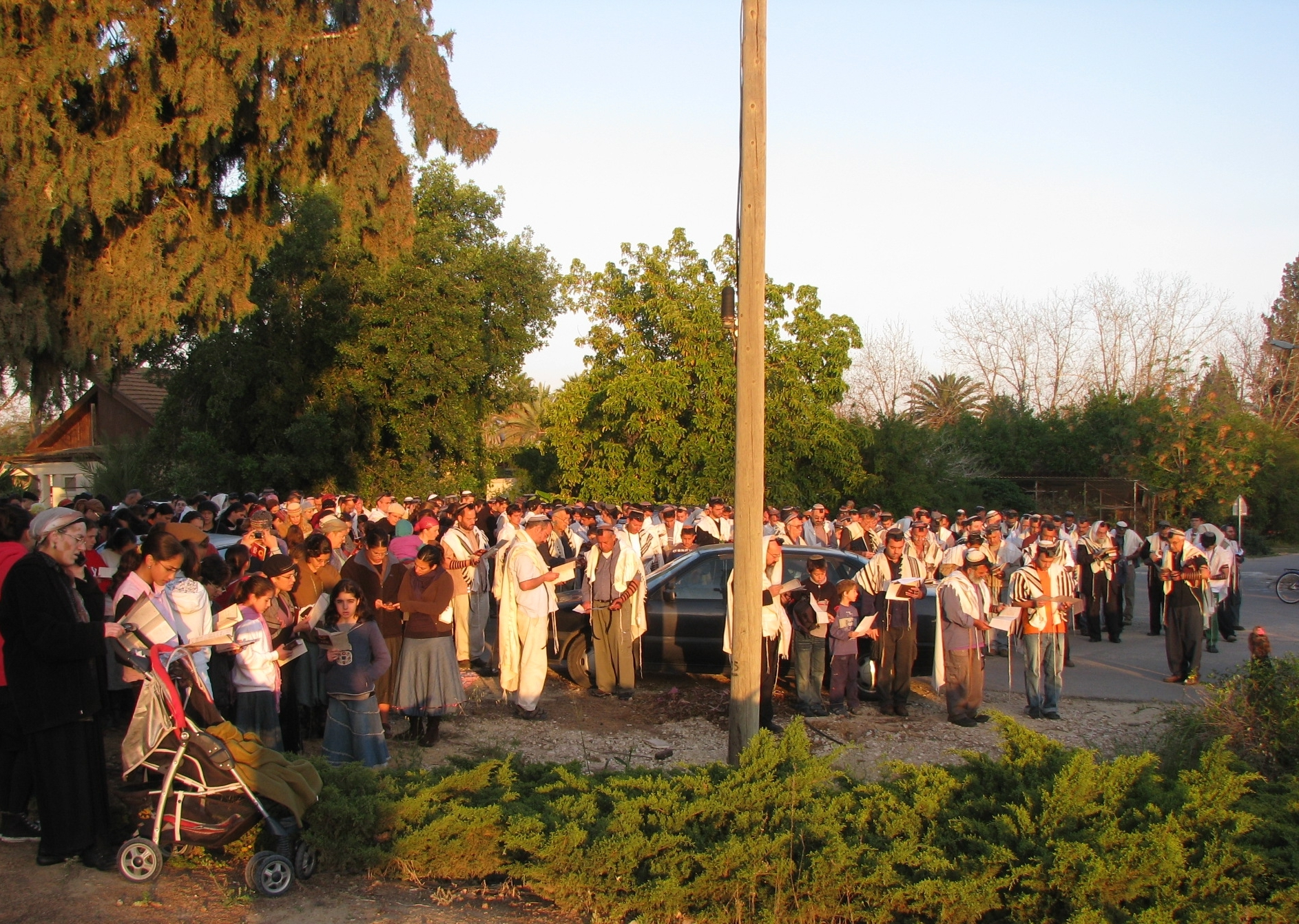
Blessing of the Sun in Kfar Maimon, 8 April 2009

The Shulchan Aruch states that this blessing, generally said upon experiencing natural phenomena, should also be recited upon witnessing the chammah bi-tkufatah (חמה בתקופתה = sun at its turning point). This term, quoted from the above-mentioned Beraita, is explained by the Chofetz Chaim as referring to the point in time at which the Sun returns to the start of its cycle, similar to when it was created.

As explained below, the blessing is recited on the morning after the Sun completes its cycle; ideally, it should be recited at sunrise, referred to in Jewish law as haneitz hachammah. It is preferred to recite the blessing with a multitude of people, in keeping with the principle of b'rov am hadrat melech. The Magen Avraham and the Levush insist that it be recited within the first three hours after sunrise. The Mishnah Brurah, however, states on behalf of numerous Achronim that it is permitted the blessing to be recited until halachic noon.

According to most opinions, the blessing may only be recited if the Sun can be seen. However, if the Sun is completely blocked by clouds, there is a minority view that allows the blessing to be recited nevertheless, because essentially the blessing is on the concurrence of the Sun's physical position with the timing of the day.

== Overview ==
According to the Babylonian Talmud, the Sun makes a 28-year cycle to return to the position that it was in when the Universe was first created at the time (Tuesday evening) it was created.

According to Jewish tradition, the Sun was created on the fourth day (יום רביעי, yom revi'i) of the week of Creation. Because Jewish law considers the time unit of a day to span from evening to evening, the beginning of the halachic fourth day, so to speak, is on Tuesday evening at sundown. The 28-year cycle therefore begins and ends at the point in time when the Sun was created, this being sundown on Tuesday. The Sun only returns to this exact position at sundown on a Tuesday once every 28 years.

Despite the rigorous calculations that follow, there is no synchronization of this prayer and the actual astronomical point in time when the Sun crosses the celestial equator; the symbolism is no different from a situation in which the molad for Tishrei would fall out by day on a Sunday and Rosh Hashanah falls out on Monday.

== The vernal equinox ==
As explained in the Talmud, there is a tradition that the Sun was created in its vernal equinox position at the beginning of the springtime Jewish lunar month of Nissan. The sages of the Talmud settled disputes over the halachic definition of the vernal equinox by establishing it on March 25 of the Julian calendar. Because both the Julian calendar and Jewish tradition define a solar year as exactly 365.25 days, the halachic vernal equinox historically fell out on March 25 every year. This halachic equinox now falls about 17 days after the true equinox, with the error increasing by about 3/4 of a day per century.

In summary, Birkat Hachama is recited when the halachic vernal equinox (the position at which the Sun was created) occurs at sundown on a Tuesday (the time at which the sun was created).

== The solar calendar ==
This method of marking the cycle of machzor gadol (that is, using the 25th of March) was invalidated in 1582 when the Julian calendar was replaced by the Gregorian calendar by decree of Pope Gregory XIII. The calendar was adjusted to allow for Easter to be celebrated in the appropriate time according to an agreement reached at the First Council of Nicaea in 325 CE. To recalibrate the calendar, two adjustments were made:

1. Ten days were removed in order to compensate for the incorporation of excess days since the establishment of the Julian calendar.
2. A method to avoid further incorporation of excess days was put into place, whereby February 29 would be skipped according to a particular algorithm.

The last day of the Julian calendar was Thursday, 4 October 1582 and this was followed by the first day of the Gregorian calendar, Friday, 15 October. Thus, while the halachic vernal equinox occurred on March 25 until 1582, in 1583 it occurred on April 4 in countries that had accepted the new Gregorian Calendar. Nevertheless, other counties did not accept the Gregorian calendar right away; English accepted it on 1752, and some Eastern Orthodox churches continue to use the Julian calendar to this day.

For establishing the dates of the Jewish calendar, an algorithm is used that is more accurate than the Julian calendar, although not quite as accurate as the Gregorian calendar. However, since the computations of the seasons was something that the Sages wanted everyone to understand, they used the less accurate computation identical to the Julian calendar. Thus, the Jewish calendar was not modified. As a result, the halachic vernal equinox has been shifting slightly forward in the Gregorian every century.

- In 1609, the halachic vernal equinox was on April 4
- In 1709, the halachic vernal equinox was on April 5
- In 1809, the halachic vernal equinox was on April 6
- In 1909, the halachic vernal equinox was on April 7
- In 2009, the halachic vernal equinox was on April 7
- In 2109, the halachic vernal equinox will fall on April 8
- In 2209, the halachic vernal equinox will fall on April 9
- In 2309, the halachic vernal equinox will fall on April 10

The halachic equinox usually jumps a day every century because the algorithm that established the Gregorian calendar dictates that leap years do not occur in years divisible by 100, unless also divisible by 400. Jewish law, however, provides keeps the original computation. There was no shift between 1909 and 2009, however, because of the exception regarding years divisible by 400; thus, the year 2000 did contain a February 29 and no compensation was necessary. The table at right depicts all the vernal equinoxes from 1981 to 2009, two years in which Birkat Hachama occurs; note that the equinox does not occur at sunset (time=0) on the fourth day (Tuesday) any other years in the entire 28-year cycle.

The halachic year of 365.25 days is equivalent to 52 weeks, 1 day and 6 hours. This means that any given date will, three times out of four, appear a day later in the calendar week in a subsequent year. For example:

- July 3, 1932 was on Sunday
- July 3, 1933 was on Monday
- July 3, 1934 was on Tuesday
- July 3, 1935 was on Wednesday

July 3, 1936, however, was on a Friday and not a Thursday because the six hours that accrued over each of the four years effectively adds another calendar day (i.e. 6 hours × 4 years = 24 hours = 1 day).

Halacha maintains that the Sun was created in the position of the vernal equinox immediately after sundown on the fourth day of the week of Creation, which is equivalent to sunset on Tuesday of that week. If that is considered time zero (t=0), and subsequent years' vernal equinoxes occur one day and six hours later, it would appear as follows:

- Year 1: Day 4 at sunset (Tuesday)
- Year 2: Day 5 at midnight (Thursday)
- Year 3: Day 6 at sunrise (Friday)
- Year 4: Day 7 at noon (Saturday)
- Year 5: Day 2 at sunset (Sunday)
- Year 6: Day 3 at midnight (Tuesday)

Every four years sees a jump of an additional day because the four six-hour periods sum to a full day. This is somewhat similar to a solar leap year occurring every 4 years to account for the four quarter days that accrued at a rate of a quarter day per year.

Although the proper time for the blessing would be at sundown on Tuesday April 7, the Sun is no longer visible at sundown; the blessing is therefore delayed until the following morning.

The 28-year cycle is based on a solar year of 365.25 days, which is only nearly precise. The Hebrew calendar itself uses a solar year of 365.2468222 days, but utilizes the less precise approximation of 365.25 for Birkat Hachama so that the blessing might occur with some frequency.

See also Hebrew calendar: Accuracy.

== How the date is calculated ==
This table represents a week with all the 24 hours marked and labeled by the "planet", actually a celestial light in direct translation, which corresponds to them according to the ancient geocentric model of "planet" order. It is based on Rashi's commentary to Eruvin 56a. We create this table by noting that in the Bible the stars were created on Wednesday at twilight so we place Saturn (the first "star") at hour 1 (or 6:00 p.m.). Then we follow with all the six other "planets" (Jupiter, Mars, Sun, Venus, Mercury, and Moon) and repeat the order until all the hours of the week have a "star" assigned to them.

–	1	2	3	4	5	6	7	8	9	10	11	12	13	14	15	16	17	18	19	20	21	22	23	24
Sunday	Merc	Moon	Sat	Jup	Mar	Sun	Ven	Merc	Moon	Sat	Jup	Mar	Sun	Ven	Merc	Moon	Sat	Jup	Mar	Sun	Ven	Merc	Moon	Sat
Monday	Jup	Mar	Sun	Ven	Merc	Moon	Sat	Jup	Mar	Sun	Ven	Merc	Moon	Sat	Jup	Mar	Sun	Ven	Merc	Moon	Sat	Jup	Mar	Sun
Tuesday	Ven	Merc	Moon	Sat	Jup	Mar	Sun	Ven	Merc	Moon	Sat	Jup	Mar	Sun	Ven	Merc	Moon	Sat	Jup	Mar	Sun	Ven	Merc	Moon
Wednesday	Sat	Jup	Mar	Sun	Ven	Merc	Moon	Sat	Jup	Mar	Sun	Ven	Merc	Moon	Sat	Jup	Mar	Sun	Ven	Merc	Moon	Sat	Jup	Mar
Thursday	Sun	Ven	Merc	Moon	Sat	Jup	Mar	Sun	Ven	Merc	Moon	Sat	Jup	Mar	Sun	Ven	Merc	Moon	Sat	Jup	Mar	Sun	Ven	Merc
Friday	Moon	Sat	Jup	Mar	Sun	Ven	Merc	Moon	Sat	Jup	Mar	Sun	Ven	Merc	Moon	Sat	Jup	Mar	Sun	Ven	Merc	Moon	Sat	Jup
Saturday	Mar	Sun	Ven	Merc	Moon	Sat	Jup	Mar	Sun	Ven	Merc	Moon	Sat	Jup	Mar	Sun	Ven	Merc	Moon	Sat	Jup	Mar	Sun	Ven

It is assumed that the world was created in the Hebrew month of Nissan, not Tishrei. So hour 1 (sunset) on Wednesday on this chart represents the beginning of Tekufat Nissan (Spring) in the first year of creation, the Hebrew year 1. For the purpose of Birkat Hachama, the calculation of Samuel of Nehardea for the length of a tropical year is used not the more accurate calculation of Adda bar Ahavah. Therefore, a year is assumed to be 52 weeks and one day and six hours (365.25 days). This means that a year after creation Tekufat Nissan will occur one day and six hours later on this chart, or on Thursday at the sixth hour, Jupiter. Each year this will shift another day and six hours. It will take 28 years for Tekufat Nissan to return to being on Wednesday at twilight. It is worth noting that the true spring equinox occurs on March 21 yet Birkat Hachama is said 18 days later. This inaccuracy accrued over thousands of years as a result of using the inexact calculation of Samuel for the length of the year.

== Order of the service ==
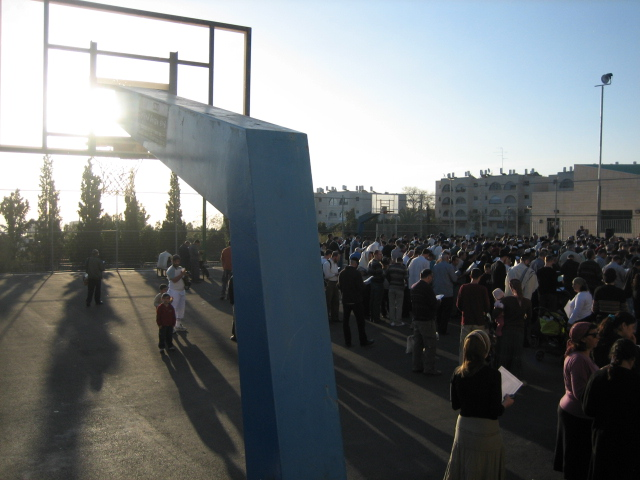
Birkat Hachama in 2009 Ma'ale Adumim

The service generally includes:

- Psalms 148:1–6
- The blessing: "Baruch Atah A-donai E-loheinu Melech Ha`olam Oseh Ma`aseh Breisheet."
- Those who say the Shehecheyanu blessing, do so here.
- Psalm 19
- Psalm 121
- Psalm 150
- A passage from the Talmud regarding the obligation of Birkat Hachama.
- Psalm 67
- Aleinu
- The mourner's Kaddish.

The Shehecheyanu blessing is not recited. There is no obligation to say Birkat Hachama: it is an opportunistic blessing recited only if one happens to see the sun in this state; such blessings (another example is the annual blessing upon seeing flowering fruit trees in Nisan) receive no Shehecheyanu. Those who do recite Shehecheyanu should take care to wear a new garment or have a new fruit close by, to remove all doubt.

== Occurrences of Birkat Hachama ==
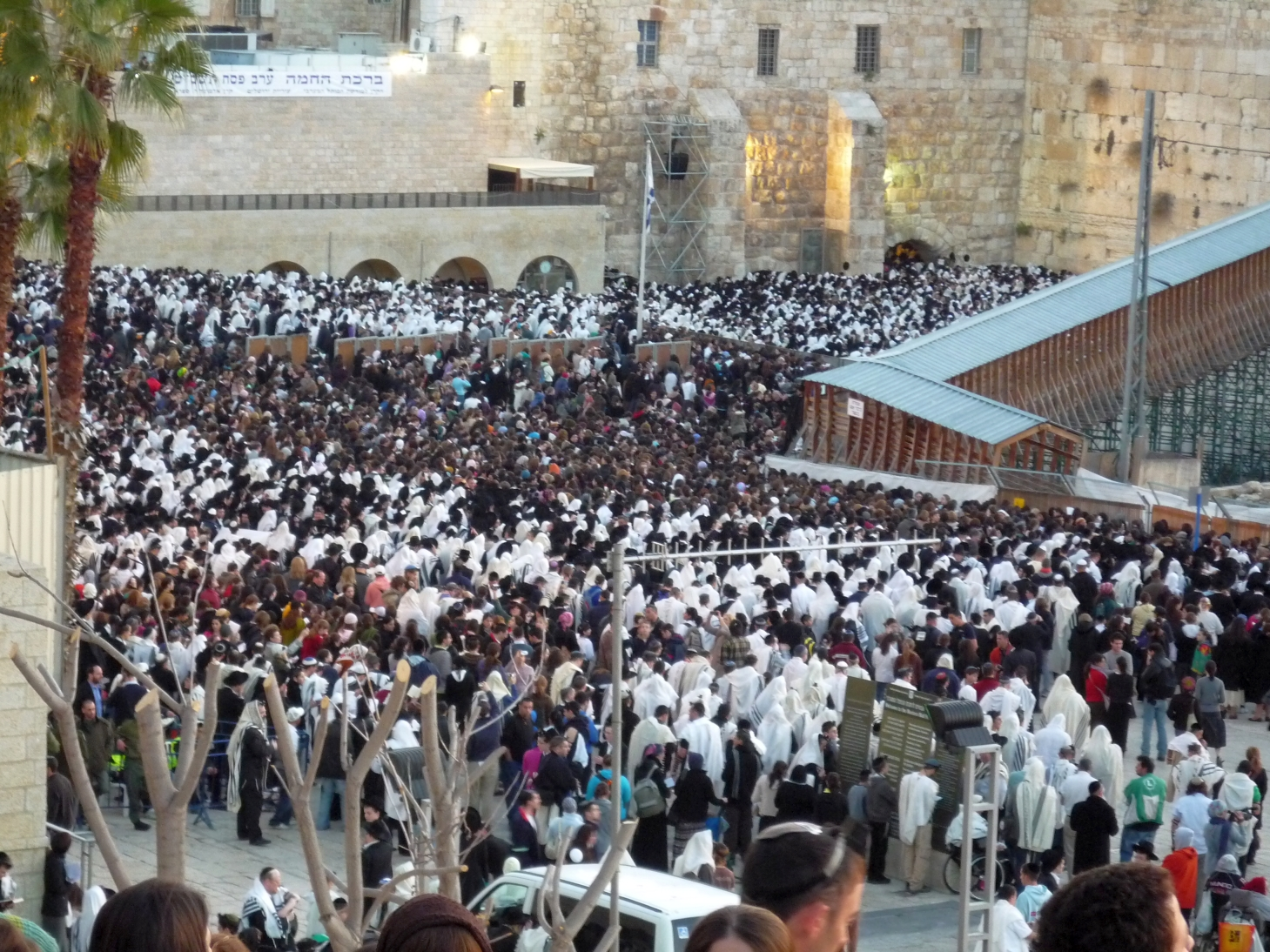
Birkat Hachama 8 April 2009, 6:25, Western Wall, Jerusalem

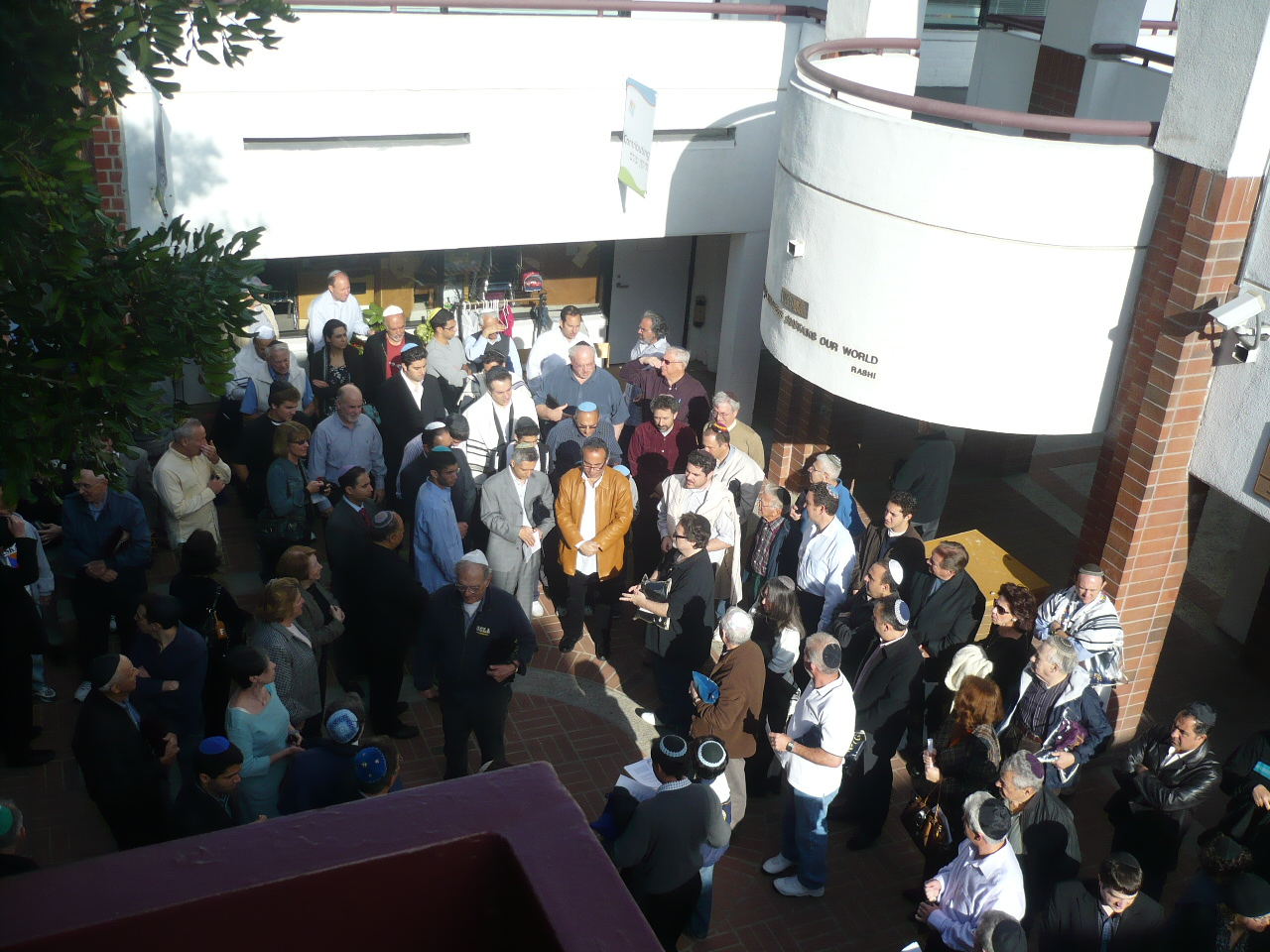
Birkat Hachama 2009 Encino, CA

Occurrences in the last 120 years:

- Wednesday, 7 April 1897 (5 Nisan 5657)
- Wednesday, 8 April 1925 (14 Nisan 5685 – Erev Pesach/Passover Eve)
- Wednesday, 8 April 1953 (23 Nisan 5713)
- Wednesday, 8 April 1981 (4 Nisan 5741)
- Wednesday, 8 April 2009 (14 Nisan 5769 – Erev Pesach/Passover Eve)

Birkat Hachama will occur next on

- Wednesday, 8 April 2037 (23 Nisan 5797)
- Wednesday, 8 April 2065 (2 Nisan 5825)
- Wednesday, 8 April 2093 (12 Nisan 5853)
- Wednesday, 9 April 2121 (21 Nisan 5881 – Shvi'i Shel Pesach/Seventh Day of Passover)
- Wednesday, 9 April 2149 (2 Nisan 5909)

Note: Because the dates for Birkat Hachama assume a 365.25-day solar year and the Julian calendar also assumes a 365.25-day solar year, Birkat Hachama will always fall on March 26 in the Julian calendar. While Birkat Hachama usually occurs in the Jewish lunar month of Nissan, this is not always the case; it will occur on 29 Adar II (April 10) in the year 2233.

== Lerman's thesis ==
Moshe Lerman suggested a background to Birkat Hachama by pointing out a possible connection between the traditional Hebrew dating and the two machzorim ("cycles") that are observed in Jewish tradition—the "small" 19-year cycle which is the basis of the Jewish calendar, and the "big" 28-year cycle which determines the year in which Birkat Hachama is recited. Mathematically, if one knows the position of a certain year in both cycles, one can compute the number associated to the year modulo 532 (19 times 28), given that the starting point of both cycles is year 1.

Because the astronomical year is slightly shorter than 365.25 days, the date of Birkat Hachama shifts away from the spring equinox as history proceeds. A simple astronomical calculation shows that 84 cycles of 28 years before 5769, in the Jewish year 3417, the spring equinox was in the beginning of the night before the fourth day of the week as stipulated by the Talmud. Lerman takes this as a hint that the astronomically astute Jewish sages of the time concluded that the Jewish year 3417 was a first year in the cycle of 28 years. Moreover, Lerman suggests that these same Jewish sages would have reasoned that year 3421 was a first year in the 19-year cycle, in accordance with an ancient tradition that the world was created in the first week of the month of Nissan, and thus the sun was created on the fourth day of Nissan. Since every 19 years the solar and lunar calendars align, and the Spring equinox of 3421 occurred early in the night leading to the fourth day of the Jewish month of Nissan, it follows that 3421 was the first year of a 19-year cycle.

Lerman surmises that the Jewish sages at the time could argue for a determination of the position of their years in both cycles and could therefore compute the absolute year-count modulo 532 years. They were left with a number of options, 532 years apart from each other, and Lerman suggests that they chose the dating closest to what seemed to be the truth according to a literal interpretation of biblical accounts. The sages legally defined future equinox times by instituting the 28-year cycle, to protect the Hebrew dating against future change, and to leave a remembrance to what they had done.

== Bibliography ==
- J. David Bleich (Rabbi). Birchas Hachammah. Blessing Of The Sun – Renewal Of Creation. A Halachic Analysis And Anthology With A New Translation And Commentary. Overviews by Rabbi Nosson Scherman. Mesorah Publications: Brooklyn, N.Y., January 2009. ISBN 0-89906-175-3, ISBN 978-0-89906-175-7.
- Avrohom Blumenkrantz (Rabbi). Yiro'ucho Im Shomesh (May they fear you with the Sun). A Halachic Exposition on the Solar Cycle And the Order of the Blessing of the Sun. Also, 11 short steps to construct a Jewish Calendar. Bais Medrash Ateres Yisroel, 827 Cornaga Avenue, Far Rockaway, N.Y., 2009.
- Yehudah Marks. Blessing Of The Sun. Hamodia Magazine, February 11, 2009, p. 10–14.
