= Shehecheyanu =

Jewish prayer

The Shehecheyanu berakhah (blessing) (Hebrew: בִּרְכַּת שֶׁהֶחֱיָנוּ, "Who has given us life") is a common Jewish prayer to celebrate special occasions. It expresses gratitude to God for new and unusual experiences or possessions. The blessing was recorded in the Talmud over 1500 years ago.

== Recitation ==
The blessing of Shehecheyanu is recited in thanks or commemoration of:

- Generally, when doing or experiencing something that occurs infrequently from which one derives pleasure or benefit.
- The beginning of a holiday, including Passover, Shavuot, Rosh Hashanah, Yom Kippur, Sukkot, Simhat Torah and Hanukkah, but not holidays commemorating sad events, such as Tisha B'av.
- The first performance of certain mitzvot in a year, including sitting in a sukkah, eating matzah at the Passover Seder, reading the megillah, or lighting the candles on Hanukkah.
- Eating a new fruit for the first time since Rosh Hashanah.
  Normally said before the blessing over the fruit, but some customarily say it afterwards.
  The fruit must be fresh, not dried.
- Seeing a friend who has not been seen in thirty days.
- Acquiring a new home or other significant possessions.
- The birth of a child.
- A pidyon haben ceremony.
- During a ritual immersion in a mikveh as part of a conversion.
- On arrival in Eretz Israel.

Some have the custom of saying it at the ceremony of the Birkat Hachama, which is recited once every 28 years in the month of Nisan/Adar II.

When several reasons apply (such as the beginning of Passover, together with the mitzvot of matzah, marror, etc.), the blessing is only said once.

It is not recited at a brit milah by Ashkenazim, since the circumcision involves pain, nor at the Counting of the Omer, since that is a task that does not give pleasure and causes sadness at the thought that the actual Omer ceremony cannot be performed because of the destruction of the Temple. However, it is recited by Sephardim at the berith milah ceremony.

== Text ==
Hebrew	English	Transliteration
בָּרוּךְ אַתָּה יהוה	Praised are You, Lord	Barukh attah adonai
אֱלֹהֵינוּ מֶלֶךְ הַעוֹלָם	our God, King of the universe,	eloheinu melekh ha-olam,
שֶׁהֶחֱיָנוּ וְקִיְּמָנוּ	For granting us life, for sustaining us,	she-heḥeyanu v'kiy'manu
וְהִגִּיעָנוּ לַזְּמַן הַזֶּה׃	and for helping us to reach this day.	v'higi'anu la-z'man hazeh.

Although the most prevalent custom is to recite lazman in accordance with the usual rules of dikduk (Hebrew language grammar), some, including Chabad, have the custom to say lizman ("to [this] season"); this custom follows the ruling of the Mishnah Berurah and Aruch Hashulchan, following Magen Avraham, Mateh Moshe and Maharshal.

== Modern history ==
Avshalom Haviv finished his speech in court on June 10, 1947, with the Shehecheyanu blessing.

The Israeli Declaration of Independence was publicly read in Tel Aviv on May 14, 1948, before the expiration of the British Mandate at midnight. After the first Prime Minister of Israel, David Ben-Gurion, read the Declaration of Independence, Rabbi Yehuda Leib Maimon recited the Shehecheyanu blessing, and the Declaration of Independence was signed. The ceremony concluded with the singing of "Hatikvah."

There is a common musical rendition of the blessing composed by Meyer Machtenberg, an Eastern European choirmaster who composed it in the United States in the 19th century.

== Media ==
- MP3 file - Shehecheyanu blessing from VirtualCantor.com (tune for the first night of Chanukah)
- Sheet music for Shehecheyanu

== See also ==
- List of Jewish prayers and blessings
- Halachipedia article on Shehecheyanu
- Salat al-Istikharah
