= Beracah =

Valley mentioned in the Hebrew Bible

Coordinates: 31°38′1.94″N 35°7′3.76″E

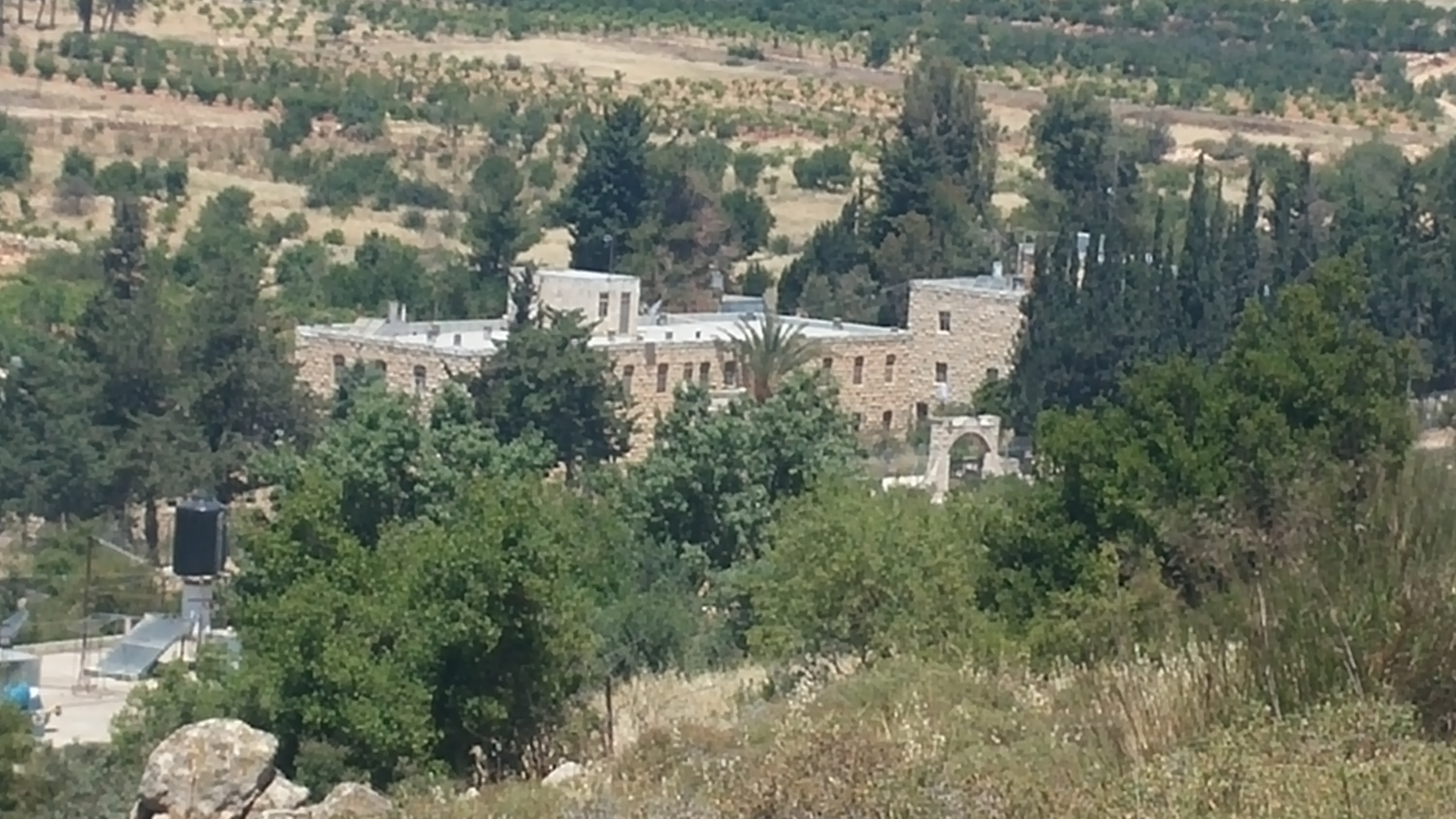

Beracah is a valley mentioned in the Hebrew Bible (Old Testament). It was named the "Valley of Blessings ("blessing" is "Berakhah" in Hebrew) by Jehoshaphat, king of Judah after God’s victory over Moab and Ammon, as is recounted in the Second Book of Chronicles.

The valley is on the main road from Hebron to Jerusalem.

According to the Chronicler's account, Jehoshaphat gathered his people together and prayed to God for deliverance. God answered his prayer by stirring up the enemy to kill each other. By the time Jehoshaphat and his army entered the valley, the enemy had completely destroyed themselves. The army took three days to collect the valuables of their enemies including gold, silver, and precious jewels: hence the valley was called "The Valley of Blessing".
