= Bracha =

Jewish blessing

In Judaism, a berakhah, bracha, brokho, brokhe (Hebrew: בְּרָכָה; pl. בְּרָכוֹת, berakhot, brokhoys; "benediction," "blessing") is a formula of blessing or thanksgiving, recited in public or private, usually before the performance of a commandment, or the enjoyment of food or fragrance, and in praise on various occasions.

The function of a berakhah is to acknowledge God as the source of all blessing. It can be both a declaration of dependence and an expression of gratitude for God and his gifts. Berakhot also have an educational function to transform a variety of everyday actions and occurrences into religious experiences designed to increase awareness of God at all times. For this purpose, the Talmudic sage Rabbi Meir declared that it was the duty of every Jew to recite one hundred berakhot every day.

The Mishnah of tractate Berakhot, and the gemara in both Talmuds, contain detailed rabbinical discussions of berakhot, upon which the laws and practice of reciting blessings are founded.

Berakhot typically start with the words "Blessed are You, Lord our God..."

One who hears another recite a berakhah answers with amen; but one who is engaged in prayer may at certain points be forbidden from other speech, including responding amen. With few exceptions, one does not respond amen to their own berakha, although other prayers—such as the kaddish—include "amen" in their text.

== Categories of blessings ==
There are three major categories of berakhah:

- on pleasurable experiences (Hebrew: בִּרְכוֹת הַנֶּהֱנִין, romanized: birək̲ot̲ hannehenin) such as before eating food or smelling fragrances
- when performing a commandment (ברכות הַמִּצְוֹת birək̲ot̲ hammiṣwot̲) such as the lighting of Sabbath candles
- in praise, gratitude or recognition of God's justice (ברכות השבח הוֹדָאָה birək̲ot̲ heššebaḥ wəhoḏāʾā), such as upon seeing awe-inspiring natural phenomena, or upon hearing very good or very bad news.

Blessings over food are intended to sanctify the physical act of taking nourishment; those recited before performing a commandment serve to prevent performing the activity in an unthinking, rote way; and the blessings of praise serve to remind people of the presence of God in all situations.

=== Before enjoyment ===
A sugya of the Talmud in Berkahot 35a states that food ultimately belongs to God, and that to partake of it legitimately one must express gratitude by reciting the appropriate blessing beforehand. There are six blessings said before eating different foods: Birkat Hamotzi (bread); Borei Minei Mezonot (five species of grain); Borei Pri HaGafen (wine and grapes); Borei Pri Ha'etz (fruits and vegetables); Borei Pri Ha'adamah (vegetables), and Shehakol (unspecified foods), according to Tractate Berakhot 6:1.

Additionally, there are five blessings said after eating different foods: Birkat Hamazon, Al Hamihya, Al Hagefen, Al Ha'etz and Borei Nefashot. These blessings, however, are only required if a certain predefined amount (kezayit for a solid food, and revi'it for a liquid) is consumed within a predefined time period (different for solids and liquids).

=== When performing a mitzva ===
Blessings recited before the observance of a mitzva (commandment) begin with the formula "Blessed are You, Lord our God, King of the Universe, who has sanctified us through his commandments and commanded us to..." and mention the specific mitzva about to be performed.

The blessing for fulfilling the commandment is sometimes followed by another blessing. For example, when lighting Hanukkah candles, the additional berakha "who performed miracles for our ancestors long ago at this season". When a mitzvah is performed for the first time in a year, the Shehecheyanu is added as well.

Contrary to the usual pattern of making a blessing before the commandment, the blessing for relieving one's bodily needs and the blessing for ritually rinsing the hands are both recited afterwards. In the former case, it is forbidden to recite any blessing while one feels one's need, and so the blessing is postponed. In the latter case, one may also not recite the blessing beforehand, since clean hands are a prerequisite for it. Even if one is certain that one's hands are clean (for example, at the rabbinically instituted rinsing before breaking bread), one still recites the blessing afterwards to avoid confusion.

Also, contrary to the usual pattern, blessings are said after certain public readings from the Tanakh as well as before it. Examples include the public Torah reading, the readings from the Nevi'im called the Haftara and the recitation of Psalms of Praise, and the Hallel.

==== Mitzvot for which a blessing is not recited ====
No blessing is recited for the performance of certain commandments. Some commentators have suggested that the reason is that no blessing is said before fulfilling commandments which do not involve any action (for example, leaving the corner of the field for the poor), or the observance of which is possible only in undesirable circumstances (for example, granting a divorce, or the return of stolen goods). In the case of other commandments (for example, tzedakah "charity"), commentators say it is because there is no fixed amount or limit to the observance of the commandment; however, there is no general agreement regarding the underlying principles.

David Abudarham wrote that there is more than one reason why these commandments do not have blessings. Abudarham and Shlomo ibn Aderet suggested a blessing is not recited for tzedakah because the recipient may refuse the gift, and blessings are not recited when it is uncertain whether the mitzva will be performed.

Baruch Epstein suggested that a blessing is not recited on interpersonal mitzvot because the standard blessing text refers to Jews being distinguished from other nations who do not perform the mitzvah; however, non-Jews do perform interpersonal good deeds in Torah Temimah on Exodus 24:12. A similar reason appears in Shut Ateret Paz, part 1 volume 2, Yoreh Deah, section 10 note 4, and also in Sefer HaRokeach, Chapter 366, by Eleazar of Worms.

Yechiel Yaakov Weinberg suggested that interpersonal mitzvot are done best out of love and care for the recipient, not out of commandment or coercion, so a blessing which refers to the commandment is not recited according to Sridei Esh 1:61 page 172.

=== Praise on various occasions ===
The main purpose of this category of blessings, often called "blessings of praise," is to help remind people of the Creator at all times.

These blessings are said on various occasions, including upon hearing good and bad news; on witnessing awesome natural phenomena such as thunder and lightning, high mountains or the ocean, or a rainbow; upon visiting a place where miracles have been performed in the past, especially in the Land of Israel, and the Birkat ha-Gomel, upon being saved from danger.

HaTov vehaMetiv (בָּרוּךְ אַתָּה אֲדֹנָי מֶלֶךְ הָעוֹלָם הַטּוֹב וְהַמֵיטִיב "Blessed are You Adonay King of the World who is good and does good") is recited by a person when they hear good news that will also benefit others, such as news that one has received an inheritance or when rain begins to fall after a drought. It is also said when drinking wine different to that drunk previously at the meal.

== Structure of blessings ==
Most blessings begin with the words Barukh Atta Adonai ("Blessed are You, Lord"). When the blessing occurs at the beginning of a prayer, the words Eloheinu melekh haʿOlam ("our God, King of the Universe") are added.

There are three types of formulas for benedictions:

1. a short blessing (matbe'a katzar, "short formula") which, after the opening words, is followed by a few words of praise specific to the occasion
2. a long blessing (matbe'a arokh, "long formula"), in which the opening is followed by a more elaborate text
3. the blessing forms part of a series (berakhah ha'smukhah l'chavertah, "a blessing that is next to another") and the opening formula is omitted, except in the first benediction of each series, and only the conclusion is phrased in the style of a long blessing

== Safek berakhah ==
In certain cases, it is doubtful whether a blessing should be said, such as if someone doesn't remember whether they have already recited the proper blessing. One cannot argue to recite the blessing "just to be sure", because it is forbidden to say an unnecessary blessing so as not to transgress the grave prohibition of taking God's name in vain. The halakhic ruling in such cases is to say the blessing in a deʿOraita case, and not to say it in a derabbanan case.

== See also ==
- Beracah ("Valley of Blessings")
- Barakah (Islam; Arabic version)
- Baruch (given name)
- Brakha (daily prayer in Mandaeism)
