= B'rov am hadrat melech =

Principle in Jewish law

The Hebrew phrase b'rov am hadrat melech (ברב עם הדרת מלך, "in multitudes there is glorification of the king") is a concept in Judaism that the more Jews that are present in a single place, the more God's honor is increased. This concept has applications to the performance of Torah commandments in a public setting, as well as the gathering of Jews to protest Sabbath desecration or other willful violations of Torah law by, for example, the government.

== Sources ==
The concept is derived from Proverbs 14:28, "In the multitude of people is the king's glory; but in the want of people is the ruin of the prince." According to the Talmud, the word "king" here refers to the King of Kings, God. Thus, large worship gatherings are understood to bring more honor to God.

== Examples ==
Examples of this principle include:

- The Talmud records a disagreement regarding recitation of the blessing on the havdalah candle. According to House of Shammai each person recites the blessing individually (as this involves less delay and leaves more time for Torah study), while according to the House of Hillel one person recites the blessing on behalf of everyone present (due to the principle of b'rov am hadrat melech).
- The Talmud attempts to explain why the shofar is blown in the mussaf prayer of Rosh Hashana, rather than the earlier shacharit prayer, using the principle of b'rov am hadrat melech, as more people are typically found in the synagogue during mussaf. (However, the Talmud then rejects this explanation, as hallel (when recited) is recited in shacharit even though b'rov am hadrat melech would suggest it be recited in mussaf.)
