= Shehakol =

Jewish blessing recited before consuming food or drink not covered by other blessings

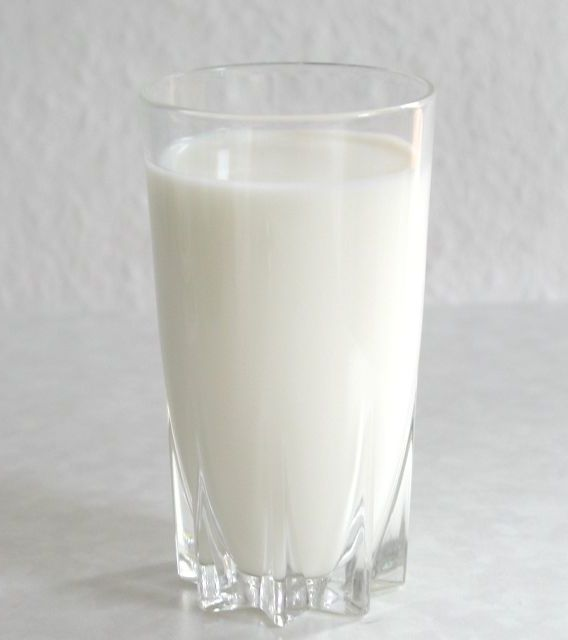
On the milk... says Shehakol"

Shehakol (Hebrew: שֶׁהַכֹּל נִהְיָה בִּדְבָרוֹ, Shehakol nihyah bidvaro, "that all was created by His word") is a blessings recited by Jews before consuming food or drink, in situations where no more specific blessing applies or the person does not know the correct blessing.

== Text ==
"Shehakol" is a common word that means "everything". The full text of the blessing is:

ברוך אתה ה' אלוהינו מלך העולם, שהכל נהיה בדברו
Blessed are You, Lord our God, King of the universe, by whose word all things came to be.

== Usage ==
The blessing of Shehakol is recited prior to consuming foods that do not fall under the specific categories of grain products, wine, fruits, or vegetables. This includes:

- Meat, fish, and eggs
- Beverages (excluding wine but, when there is 20% or 30% to not considering wine the drink of semi-wine, with partial quantity elaborated, and also brandy is “Shehakol” as drink of grape but different elaboration so this is not “wine”: this case of Halakhah is similar of the food that is not like his nature “in origin” and cannot be considered as “original with his taste and production”, for example for “candy with grain” where this isn’t “known like grain”, i.e. without the Berakhah “moré minei mezonot”, only with Shehakol)
- Candies and processed foods without a clear natural source
- Certain processed or synthetic foods

== Classification ==
Shehakol is part of the category of Birkat ha'nehenin ("blessings over enjoyment"). It is considered the most general of the first blessings and functions as a catch-all for miscellaneous foods.

== Halachic details ==
Halachic authorities discuss whether certain processed foods (e.g., chocolate, mushrooms, or coffee) should receive Shehakol or another blessing, depending on their source and form.

== In liturgy and practice ==
While primarily a private blessing, Shehakol is sometimes recited communally, such as at meals or gatherings involving food.

== Sources ==
- Rivka Neriya-Ben Shahar (2018). "The Amen Meal: Jewish Women Experience Lived Religion through a New Ritual". Nashim: A Journal of Jewish Women's Studies & Gender Issues (33): 158–176. doi:10.2979/nashim.33.1.08.
- Shahar, Rivka Neriya-Ben (2022-05-19). ""For the Amen Meal, You Don't have to Keep the Religious Duties"". Routledge Handbook of Jewish Ritual and Practice. London: Routledge. pp. 385–399. doi:10.4324/9781003032823-32. ISBN 978-1-003-03282-3.
