= Borei Pri HaGafen =

Jewish benediction

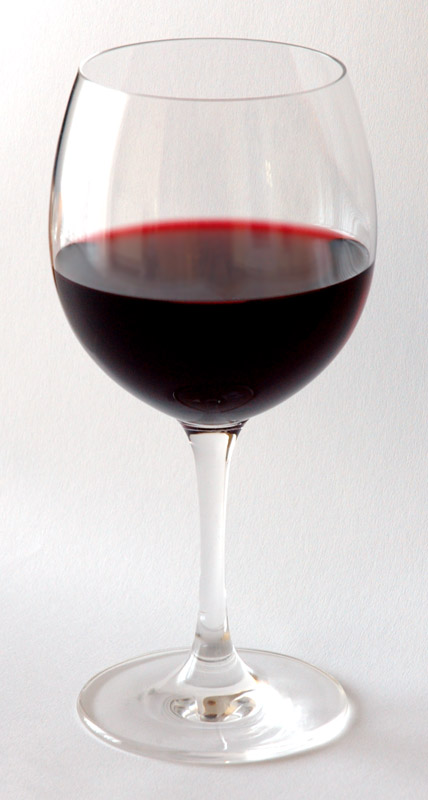
A glass of red wine

Borei Pri Ha-Gefen (Hebrew: בּוֹרֵא פְּרִי הַגָּפֶן, "[Blessed are You...] Who creates the fruit of the vine") is the Jewish benediction recited before drinking wine or grape juice and whenever wine is used to sanctify an occasion, such as during Kiddush, Havdalah and weddings. In rabbinic classification it is one of the six primary blessings for food and drink and it stands apart from the general blessing for tree-fruit (Borei Pri HaEtz) because of wine's ritual centrality in biblical and post-biblical Judaism.

== Text and translation ==
Hebrew

בָּרוּךְ אַתָּה יְיָ אֱלֹהֵינוּ מֶלֶךְ הָעוֹלָם, בּוֹרֵא פְּרִי הַגָּפֶן

Transliteration

Barukh attah Adonai, Eloheinu Melekh ha-olam, borei pri HaGefen.

English

"Blessed are You, L-ORD our God, King of the universe, Who creates the fruit of the vine."chabad.orgreformjudaism.org

While Ashkenazim pronounce ha-gáfen, many Sephardic communities articulate ha-géfen; both are halakhically valid.

== Talmudic origins ==
The Mishnah (Berakhot 6:1) records that wine receives a unique blessing distinct from other tree-fruits; the Gemara (Berakhot 35a) explains that because wine undergoes a significant transformation and is used on the altar, it merits a separate formula. Subsequent rabbinic discussion treats the blessing as paradigmatic for foods elevated by processing or ritual function.
