= Nehemiah 9 =

Chapter in the Old Testament Book of Nehemiah

- ← chapter 8 chapter 10 →
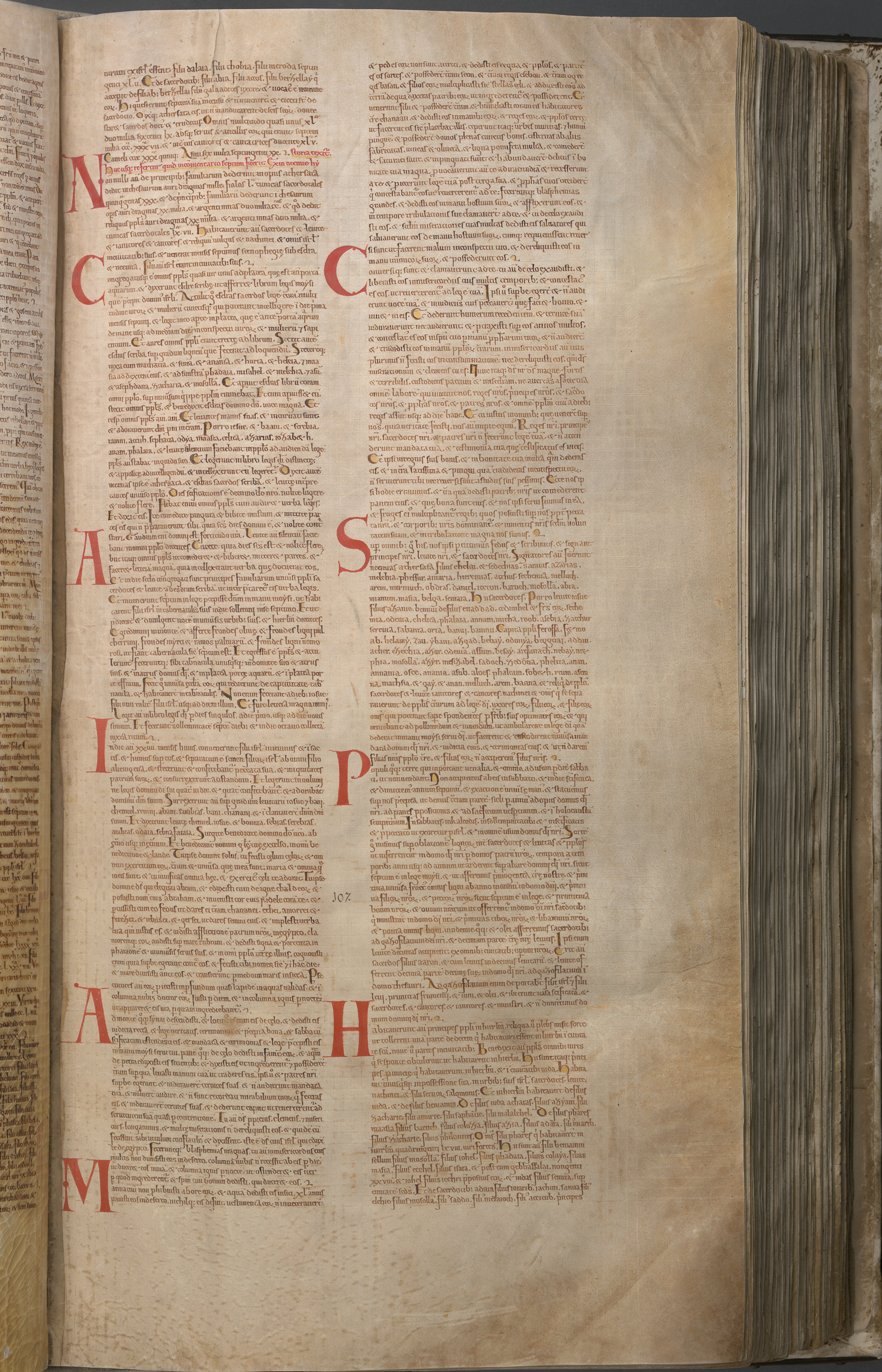
- A page containing the Latin text of Nehemiah 7:61–11:11 in the Codex Gigas, believed to be created in the early 13th century in the Benedictine monastery of Podlažice in Bohemia (modern Czech Republic).
- Book: Book of Nehemiah
- Category: Ketuvim
- Christian Bible part: Old Testament
- Order in the Christian part: 16

Nehemiah 9 is the ninth chapter of the Book of Nehemiah in the Old Testament of the Christian Bible, or the 19th chapter of the book of Ezra-Nehemiah in the Hebrew Bible, which treats the book of Ezra and the book of Nehemiah as one book. Jewish tradition states that Ezra is the author of Ezra-Nehemiah as well as the Book of Chronicles, but modern scholars generally accept that a compiler from the 5th century BCE (the so-called "Chronicler") is the final author of these books. This chapter and the previous one focus mainly on Ezra; with this chapter recording Ezra's prayer of repentance for the sake of the people (parallel to Ezra 9–10).

== Text ==
The original text of this chapter is in the Hebrew language. In English Bibles this chapter is divided into 38 verses, but only 37 verses in the Hebrew Bible, with verse 9:38 in English texts numbered as 10:1 in Hebrew texts.

=== Textual witnesses ===
Some early manuscripts containing the text of this chapter in Hebrew are of the Masoretic Text, which includes Codex Leningradensis (1008). (Note: Since the anti-Jewish riots in Aleppo in 1947, the whole book of Ezra-Nehemiah has been missing from the text of the Aleppo Codex.)

There is also a translation into Koine Greek known as the Septuagint, made in the last few centuries BCE. Extant ancient manuscripts of the Septuagint version include Codex Vaticanus (B; $\mathfrak{G}$^{B}; 4th century), Codex Sinaiticus (S; BHK: $\mathfrak{G}$^{S}; 4th century), and Codex Alexandrinus (A; $\mathfrak{G}$^{A}; 5th century).

== A time of mourning (9:1–5a) ==
The Jewish community at this time determined to sincerely follow God and to become a holy people, so they gathered in a 'demonstration of mourning, confession and [praising] God'.

=== Verse 1 ===
Now in the twenty and fourth day of this month the children of Israel were assembled with fasting, and with sackclothes, and earth upon them.

The month was Tishrei. The feast of tabernacles began on the fourteenth day of the month, and ended on the twenty-second, "all which time mourning had been forbidden, as contrary to the nature of the feast, which was to be kept with joy". Methodist commentator Joseph Benson reflects that "now, on the twenty-fourth, the next day but one after the feast, their consciences having been fully awakened, and their hearts filled with grief for their sins, which they were not allowed to express in that time of public joy, they resume their former thoughts, and, recalling their sins to mind, set apart a day for solemn fasting and humiliation". "Sackclothes" were made of "dark, coarse material associated with sorrow and repentance".

== The prayer (9:5b–37) ==
This section records the prayer of praise and petition offered by the Levites on behalf of the people to appeal for the grace of God. With the Persians presumably listening, the mentioned historical events are certainly not arbitrarily selected, as the prayer is making some strong statements:

- (1) The land is given to the Jews by God, thus outside Persian authority
- (2) This Jewish claim is 'based on God's sanction, not Persia's'
- (3) The claim is prior to Persian claims.

=== Verse 29 ===
And testified against them,
That You might bring them back to Your law.
Yet they acted proudly,
And did not heed Your commandments,
But sinned against Your judgments,
‘Which if a man does, he shall live by them.’
And they shrugged their shoulders,
Stiffened their necks,
And would not hear.

- "Testified against them": or "admonished them."
- "Proudly": or"presumptuously."
- "If a man does": Hebrew: "if a man keep", NET Bible: "if he obeys them" (cf. Nehemiah 1:5).
- "They shrugged their shoulders": Hebrew: "they gave a stubborn shoulder", NET Bible: "they boldly turned from you".
- "Stiffened their necks": or "became stubborn", NET Bible: "rebelled".

== The pledge of the people (9:38) ==
It is a tradition in the ancient Middle-East that a document (covenant, agreement) should always be authenticated by a seal or any number of seals. For example, Babylonian and Assyrian documents were often found ‘stamped with half a dozen seals or more’, which ‘were impressed upon the moist clay, and then the clay was baked’.

=== Verse 38 ===
And because of all this we make a sure covenant, and write it; and our princes, Levites, and priests, seal unto it.

- "We make a sure covenant": from Hebrew: כרתים אמנה, kō-rə-ṯîm ’ă-mā-nāh, "we make ("we are cutting") a sure (covenant)", NET Bible: "we are entering into a binding covenant".
- "And write it": Hebrew: "and writing", NET Bible: "in written form".

== See also ==
- Jerusalem
- Manna
- Ur of the Chaldees
- Related Bible parts: Exodus 16, Exodus 17, Ezra 9, Ezra 10

== Sources ==
- Fensham, F. Charles (1982). The Books of Ezra and Nehemiah. New international commentary on the Old Testament (illustrated ed.). Wm. B. Eerdmans Publishing. ISBN 978-0802825278.
- Grabbe, Lester L. (2003). "Nehemiah". In Dunn, James D. G.; Rogerson, John William (eds.). Eerdmans Commentary on the Bible (illustrated ed.). Wm. B. Eerdmans Publishing. pp. 320–328. ISBN 978-0802837110.
- Halley, Henry H. (1965). Halley's Bible Handbook: an abbreviated Bible commentary (24th (revised) ed.). Zondervan Publishing House. ISBN 0-310-25720-4.
- Larson, Knute; Dahlen, Kathy; Anders, Max E. (2005). Anders, Max E. (ed.). Holman Old Testament Commentary - Ezra, Nehemiah, Esther. Vol. 9 (illustrated ed.). B&H Publishing Group. ISBN 978-0805494693.
- Levering, Matthew (2007). Ezra & Nehemiah. Brazos Theological Commentary on the Bible. Brazos Press. ISBN 978-1587431616.
- McConville, J. G. (1985). Ezra, Nehemiah, and Esther. The daily study Bible : Old Testament. Westminster John Knox Press. ISBN 978-0664245832.
- Smith-Christopher, Daniel L. (2007). "15. Ezra-Nehemiah". In Barton, John; Muddiman, John (eds.). The Oxford Bible Commentary (first (paperback) ed.). Oxford University Press. pp. 308–324. ISBN 978-0199277186.
- Würthwein, Ernst (1995). The Text of the Old Testament. Translated by Rhodes, Erroll F. Grand Rapids, MI: Wm. B. Eerdmans. ISBN 0-8028-0788-7.
