= Cyrus the Great in the Bible =

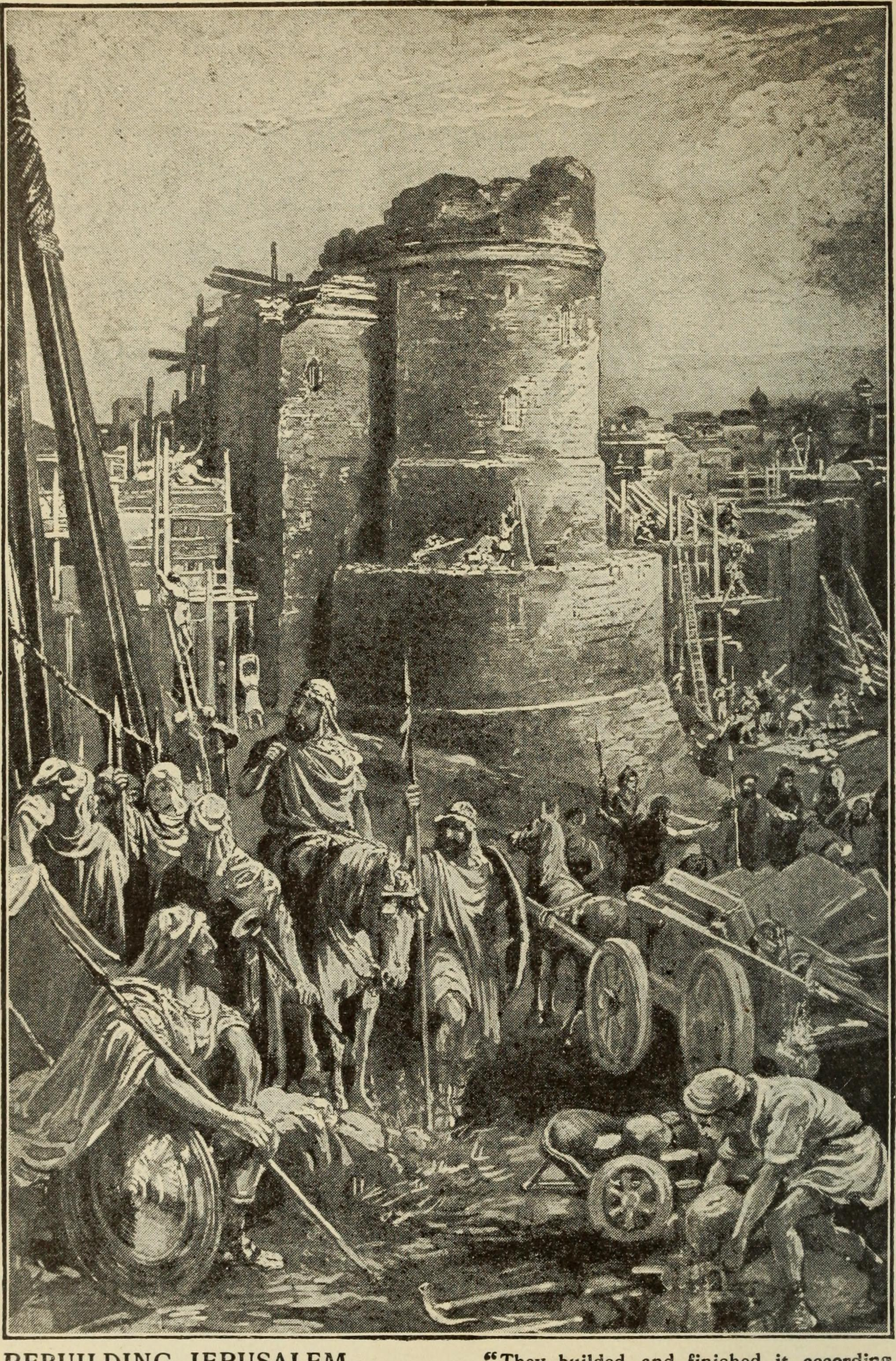
Reconstruction of Jerusalem under Cyrus, Darius, and Xerxes. Picture from the Book of Ezra, 1921.

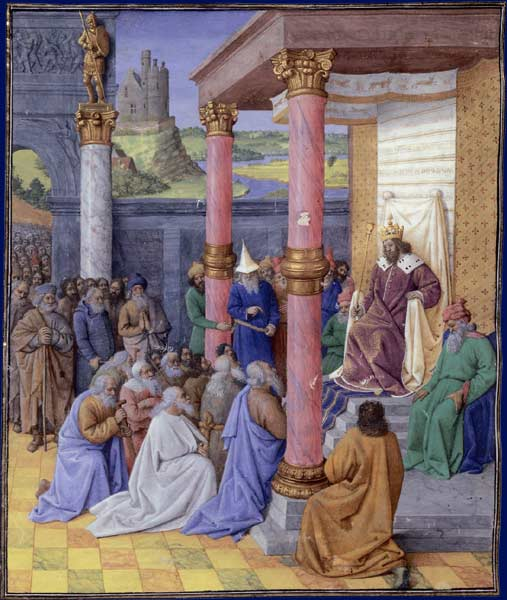
Depiction of Cyrus the Great by Jean Fouquet, 1470

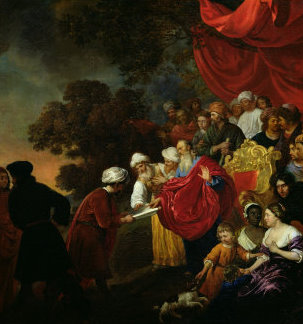
Zerubbabel displays a plan of Jerusalem to Cyrus the Great. Depiction by Jacob van Loo, 17th century.

Cyrus the Great, who founded the Achaemenid Empire in 550 BC and ruled it until his death in 530 BC, is the subject of much praise in the Hebrew Bible. He is noted for his role in conquering the Neo-Babylonian Empire and thereafter liberating the Jewish people from the Babylonian captivity, which had begun after the fall of the Kingdom of Judah in 587 BC.

According to the biblical narrative, in the first year of Cyrus' reign, he was prompted by God to issue the Edict of Cyrus, a royal decree that, in the aftermath of the fall of Babylon, called for exiled Jews to be repatriated to the Land of Israel and for the rebuilding of the Temple in Jerusalem, thus initiating the return to Zion. Moreover, he showed his interest in the project by sending back with them the sacred vessels that had been taken from Solomon's Temple during the Babylonian siege of Jerusalem, along with a considerable sum of money with which to buy building materials. His efforts culminated in the construction of the Second Temple in Yehud Medinata, marking the beginning of the Second Temple period and Second Temple Judaism, which would continue until the Roman siege of Jerusalem in 70 AD. For this accomplishment, Cyrus is venerated as a messiah—the only non-Jew (as he was a Persian) to be held in this regard in Judaism.

The historicity of Cyrus' decree has been debated among scholars, as has the impact that it may have had on the nascent Jewish diaspora if the events of the Hebrew Bible did indeed take place as they are described.

== Cyrus' conquest of Babylon ==
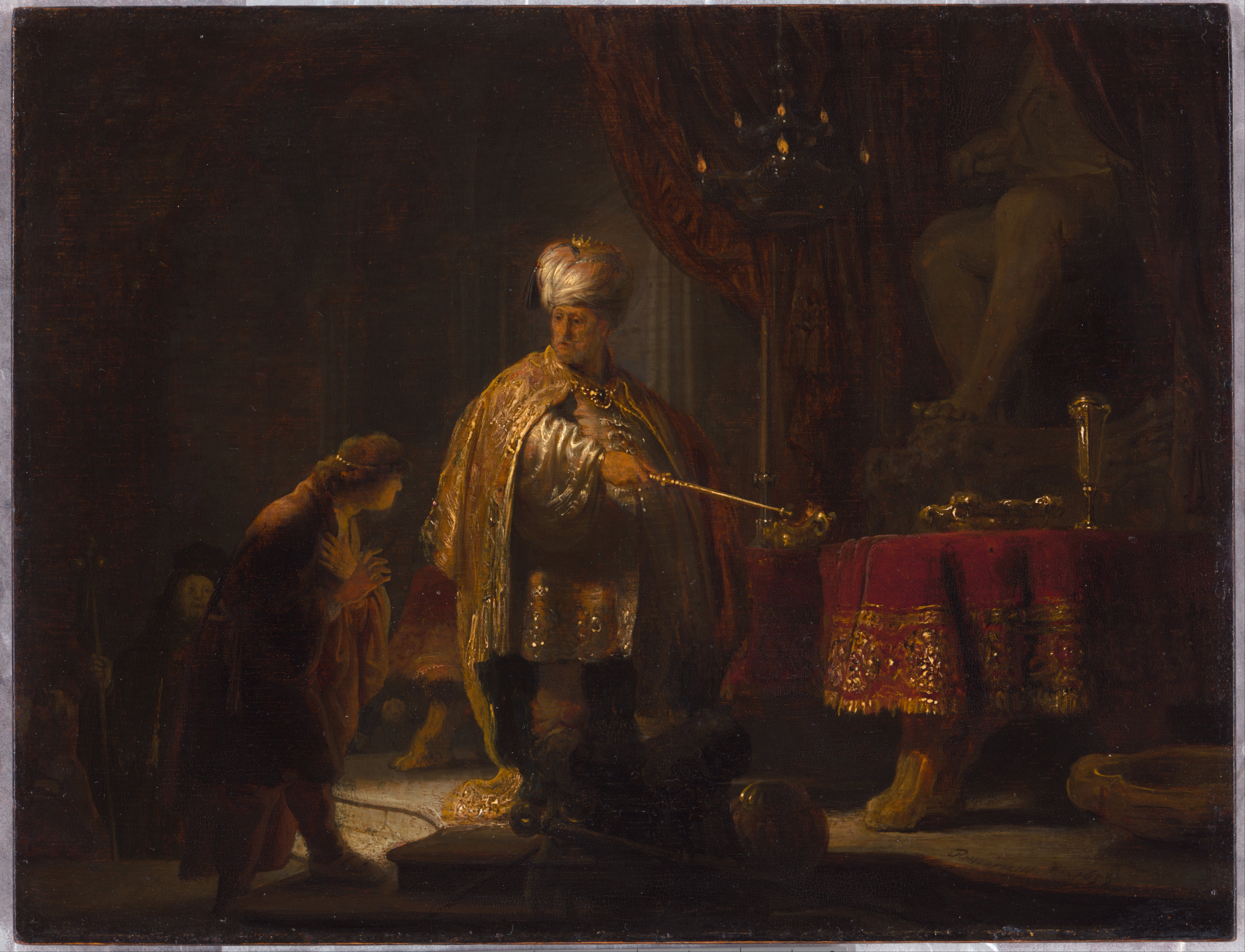
Painting by Rembrandt Harmenszoon van Rijn of Cyrus the Great with Daniel before Bel, 1633.

=== Liberation of the Jewish people ===
Cyrus the Great is highly regarded in accounts of Jewish literature. It is likely that, after the Persian conquest of the Neo-Babylonian Empire, he had commenced his relationship with exilic Jewish leaders, and the Book of Isaiah says that he was anointed by God.

The Hebrew Bible states that Cyrus issued the royal decree of liberation to the Jews. His edict for the rebuilding of the Temple in Jerusalem marked a great epoch in the history of the Jewish people. According to Ezra 4:1–6, "the enemies of Judah and Benjamin" asked to help build the Second Temple, and when this was denied, they hired counselors to frustrate the Judahites from completing the project throughout the reign of Cyrus, Xerxes ("Ahasuerus"), and Artaxerxes, until the reign of Darius II. The work recommenced under the exhortations of the Hebrew prophets, and when the authorities asked the Jews what right they had to build their Temple, they referred to the decree of Cyrus. Darius I, who was then reigning, caused a search for this alleged decree to be made, and it was found in the archives at Ecbatana, whereupon Darius reaffirmed it, allowing the work to proceed to its triumphant close.

A chronicle drawn up just after the conquest of Babylonia by Cyrus gives the history of the reign of Nabonidus ("Nabu-na'id"), the last king of Babylon, and of the fall of the Neo-Babylonian Empire. In 538 BC, there was a revolt in southern Babylonia, while the Persian army entered the country from the north. In June, the Babylonian army was completely defeated at Opis, and immediately afterwards, Sippara opened its gates to the conqueror. Gobryas ("Ugbaru"), the governor of Media, was then sent to Babylon, which surrendered "without fighting," and the daily services at the temples continued without a break. In October, Cyrus himself arrived and proclaimed a general amnesty, which was communicated by Gobryas to "all the province of Babylon," of which he had been made governor. Meanwhile, Nabonidus, who had concealed himself, was captured, but treated honourably; and when his wife died, Cyrus' son Cambyses II conducted his funeral. Cyrus now assumed the title of king of Babylon, claimed to be the descendant of the ancient kings, and made rich offerings to the temples. At the same time, he allowed the foreign populations who had been deported to Babylonia to return to their homelands, carrying with them the images of their gods. Among these populations were the Jews, who, as they had no images, took with them the sacred vessels of the destroyed Solomon's Temple from Jerusalem.

==== Motive ====
Speculation abounds as to the reasoning for Cyrus' release of the Jews from the Babylonian captivity. One argument is that Cyrus was a Zoroastrian—a follower of the religion that defined and played a dominant role in Persian society until the rise of Islam—and would have felt a kindred spirit with the people of Judaism. Another possibility is the magnanimous respect he is ascribed to have evinced for the diverse beliefs and customs of the peoples within his extended kingdom. As one example, upon the conquest of Babylonia itself, it is recorded that he paid homage at the temple of Marduk, the Babylonian national god, thereby gaining the support of the Babylonian people and minimizing further bloodshed. While Jewish tradition, as described previously in Ezra 1:1–8, indicates that "the LORD inspired King Cyrus of Persia to issue this proclamation," in the Cyrus Cylinder, he pays homage to Marduk. This Babylonian document has been interpreted as referring to the return to their homelands of several displaced cultural groups, one of which could have been the Jews:

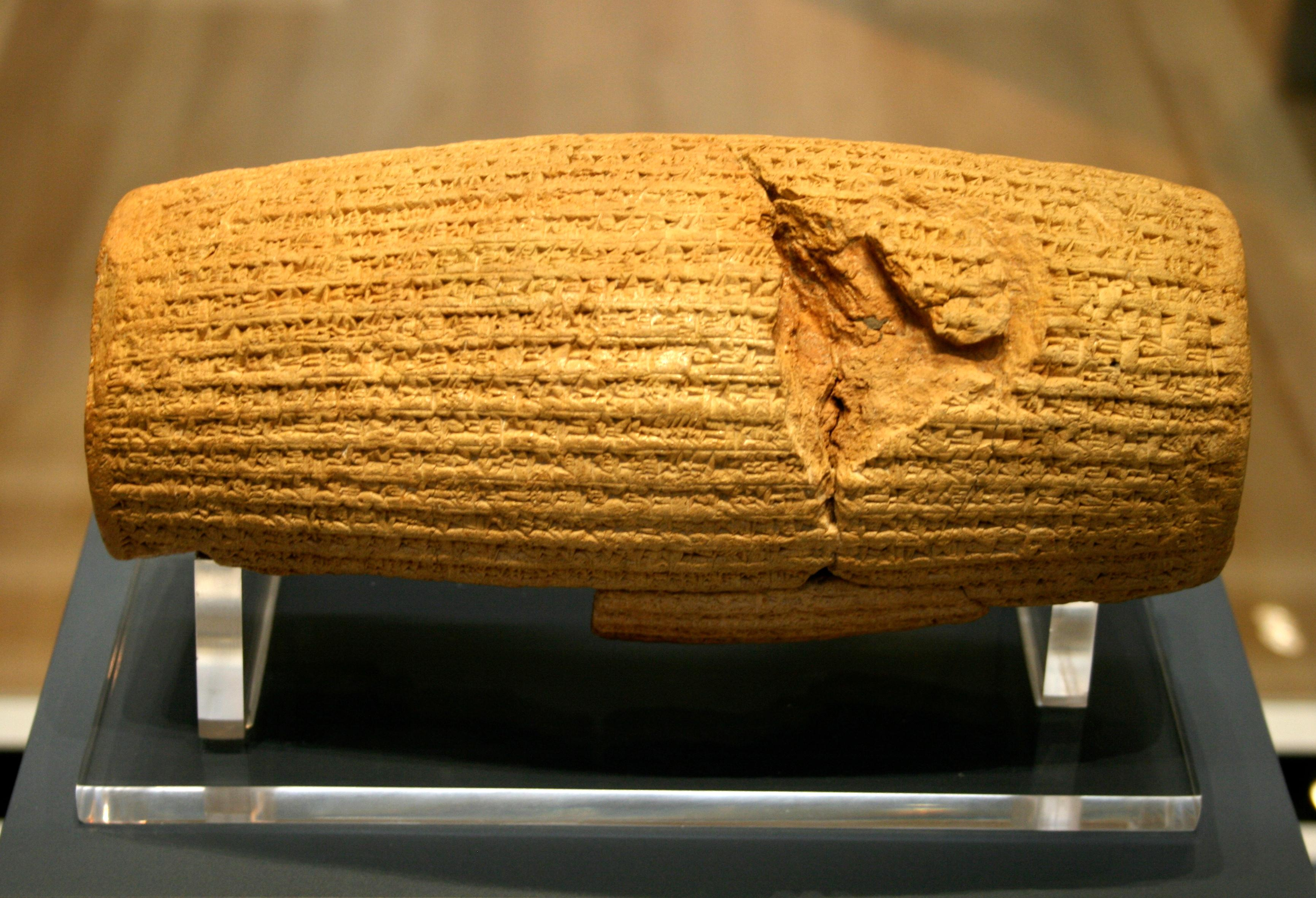
The Cyrus Cylinder, which is attributed to the Edict of Cyrus, on display at the British Museum.

From [Babylon] to Aššur and (from) Susa, Agade, Ešnunna, Zamban, Me-Turnu, Der, as far as the region of Gutium, the sacred centres on the other side of the Tigris, whose sanctuaries had been abandoned for a long time, I returned the images of the gods, who had resided there, to their places and I let them dwell in eternal abodes. I gathered all their inhabitants and returned to them their dwellings. In addition, at the command of Marduk, the great lord, I settled in their habitations, in pleasing abodes, the gods of Sumer and Akkad, whom Nabonidus, to the anger of the lord of the gods, had brought into Babylon. (lines 30–33)

However, it has been argued that it must be referring to people associated to the image's cult, as opposed to deportees. Diana V. Edelman has pointed at the serious chronological difficulties that arise when it is accepted that the Jews returned during the reign of Cyrus.

The terms used by the author of Deutero-Isaiah are reminiscent of certain passages in the Cyrus Cylinder. Traditionally, these passages in Isaiah were believed to predate the rule of Cyrus by about 100 years; however, most modern scholars date Isaiah 40–55 towards the end of the Babylonian captivity. Whereas Isaiah 1–39 (referred to as Proto-Isaiah) saw the destruction of Israel as imminent and the restoration in the future, Deutero-Isaiah speaks of the destruction in the past (Isaiah 42:24–25) and the restoration as imminent (Isaiah 42:1–9). Notice, for example, the change in temporal perspective from Isaiah 39:6–7, where the Babylonian captivity is cast far in the future, to Isaiah 43:14, where the Israelites are spoken of as already in Babylon. According to Roger Norman Whybray, the author of Deutero-Isaiah (chapters 40–55) was mistaken in thinking that Cyrus would destroy Babylon, while he instead made it more splendid than ever, and though he did allow the Jewish exiles to return home, it was not exactly in the triumphant manner that was predicted in Deutero-Isaiah.

Who roused from the east him that victory hails at every step? Who presents him with nations, subdues kings to him? His sword makes dust of them and his bow scatters them like straw. He pursues them and advances unhindered, his feet scarcely touching the road. Who is the author of this deed if not he who calls the generations from the beginning? I, the LORD, who am the first and shall be with the last.

— Isaiah 41:2–4

Then the alliance between Cyrus and God (Yahweh) is made explicit:

Thus says the LORD to his anointed, to Cyrus, whom he has taken by his right hand to subdue nations before him and strip the loins of kings, to force gateways before him that their gates be closed no more: I will go before you levelling the heights. I will shatter the bronze gateways, smash the iron bars. I will give you the hidden treasures, the secret hoards, that you may know that I am the LORD.

— Isaiah 45:1–3

=== Rebuilding the Temple in Jerusalem ===
Among the classical Jewish sources, besides the biblical account, Josephus mentions that Cyrus freed the Jews from captivity and helped rebuild the Temple in Jerusalem. He also wrote to the other rulers and governors of the region, instructing them to contribute to the project. A letter from Cyrus to the Jewish people is described by Josephus:

I have given leave to as many of the Jews that dwell in my country as please to return to their own country, and to rebuild their city, and to build the Temple of God at Jerusalem on the same place where it was before. I have also sent my treasurer Mithridates, and Zorobabel, the governor of the Jews, that they may lay the foundations of the Temple, and may build it sixty cubits high, and of the same latitude, making three edifices of polished stones, and one of the wood of the country, and the same order extends to the altar whereon they offer sacrifices to God. I require also that the expenses for these things may be given out of my revenues. Moreover, I have also sent the vessels which king Nebuchadnezzar pillaged out of the temple, and have given them to Mithridates the treasurer, and to Zorobabel the governor of the Jews, that they may have them carried to Jerusalem, and may restore them to the Temple of God. Now their number is as follows: Fifty chargers of gold, and five hundred of silver; forty Thericlean cups of gold, and five hundred of silver; fifty basons of gold, and five hundred of silver; thirty vessels for pouring [the drink-offerings], and three hundred of silver; thirty vials of gold, and two thousand four hundred of silver; with a thousand other large vessels. (3) I permit them to have the same honour which they were used to have from their forefathers, as also for their small cattle, and for wine and oil, two hundred and five thousand and five hundred drachme; and for wheat flour, twenty thousand and five hundred artabae; and I give order that these expenses shall be given them out of the tributes due from Samaria. The priests shall also offer these sacrifices according to the laws of Moses in Jerusalem; and when they offer them, they shall pray to God for the preservation of the king and of his family, that the kingdom of Persia may continue. But my will is, that those who disobey these injunctions, and make them void, shall be hung upon a cross, and their substance brought into the king's treasury."

=== Historicity of the Edict of Cyrus ===
The historical nature of Cyrus' royal decree has been challenged. Lester L. Grabbe has argued that there was no decree, but that there was a policy that allowed exiles to return to their homelands and rebuild their places of worship. He also argues that the archaeology suggests that the Jews' repatriation to Zion was a "trickle" that took place over years, perhaps decades, resulting in a maximum population of perhaps 30,000. Mary Joan Winn Leith says that, although the biblical decree may be authentic, the Cyrus Cylinder cannot confirm it. She also notes that "the Cylinder never calls for a general release of deportees or a universal restoration of centres of worship that had suffered at Babylonian hands." Through these decrees, Cyrus, like earlier rulers, was attempting to gain support from those who might be strategically important, particularly of those who were close to Egypt, which he wished to conquer. She also wrote that "appeals to Marduk in the Cylinder and to Yahweh in the biblical decree demonstrate the Persian tendency to co-opt local religious and political traditions in the interest of imperial control."

== See also ==
- Ezra 1, containing a narrative of the Edict of Cyrus
- Darius the Mede, a king of Babylon in the biblical account
- Cyrus the Great in the Quran, exploration of potential mentions in the Islamic text
