= Cyrus Cylinder =

Ancient clay cylinder with Akkadian cuneiform script

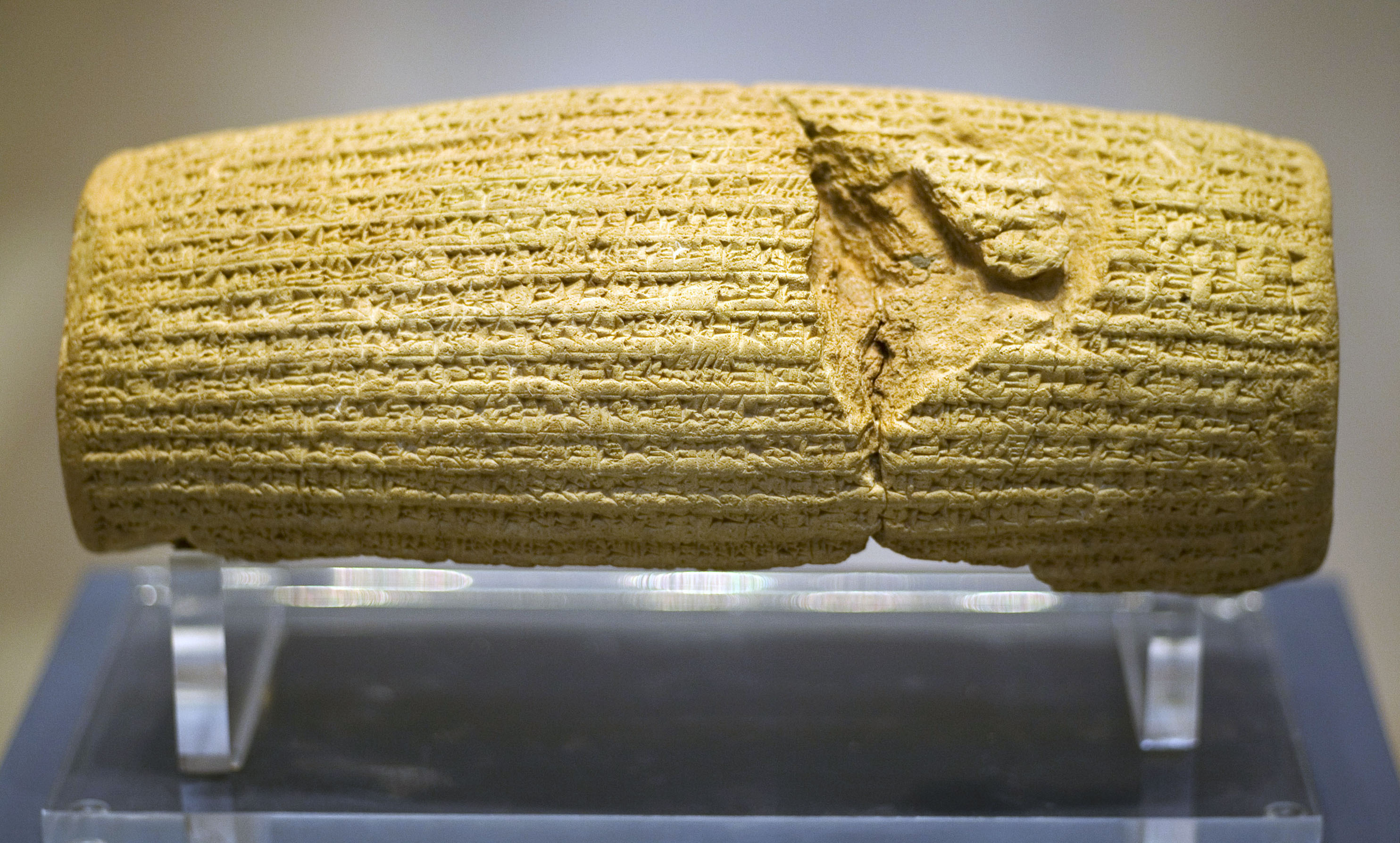
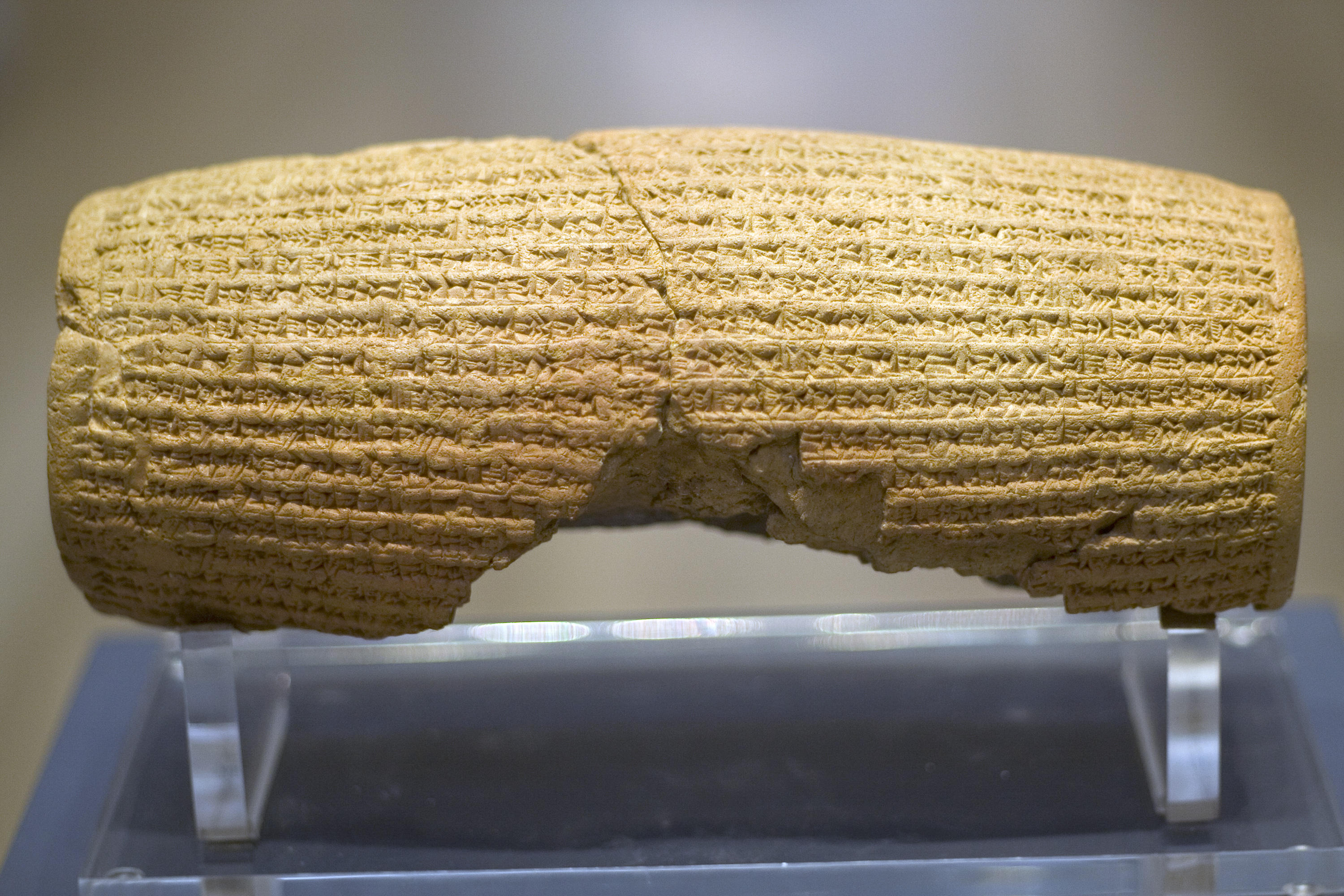
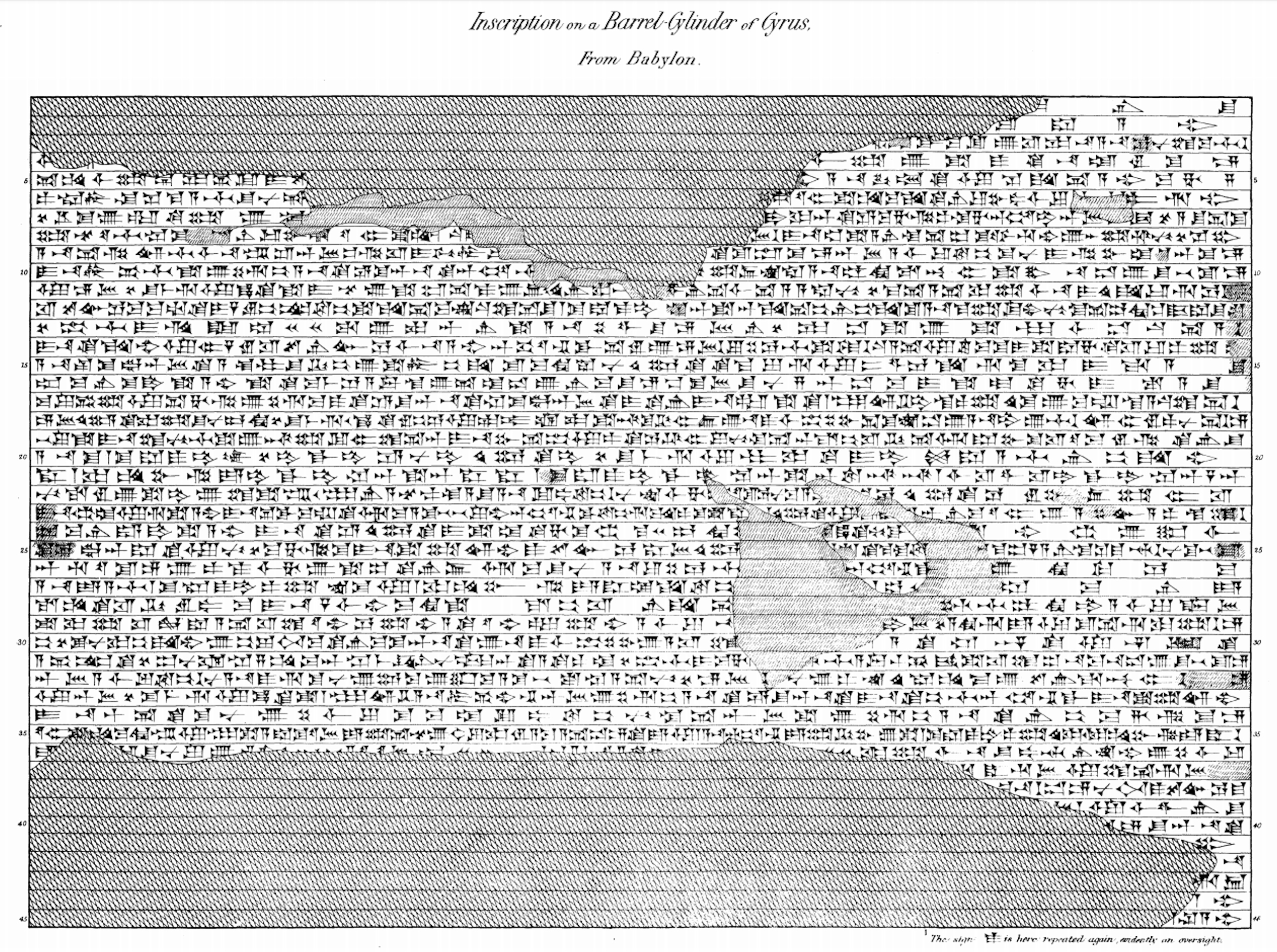
- The Cyrus Cylinder, obverse and reverse sides, and transcription
- Material: Baked clay
- Size: 21.9 centimetres (8.6 in) x 10 centimetres (3.9 in) (maximum) x (end A) 7.8 centimetres (3.1 in) x (end B) 7.9 centimetres (3.1 in)
- Writing: Akkadian cuneiform script
- Created: About 539–538 BC
- Period/culture: Achaemenid Empire
- Discovered: Babylon, Baghdad Vilayet of Ottoman Iraq, by Hormuzd Rassam in March 1879
- Present location: Room 52, British Museum (London)
- Identification: BM 90920
- Registration: 1880,0617.1941

The Cyrus Cylinder is an ancient clay cylinder, now broken into several pieces, on which is written an Achaemenid royal inscription in Akkadian cuneiform script in the name of the Persian king Cyrus the Great. It dates from the 6th century BC and was discovered in the ruins of the ancient Mesopotamian city of Babylon (now in modern Iraq) in 1879. It is currently in the possession of the British Museum. It was created and used as a foundation deposit following the Persian conquest of Babylon in 539 BC, when the Neo-Babylonian Empire was invaded by Cyrus and incorporated into his Persian Empire.

The text on the Cylinder praises Cyrus, sets out his genealogy and portrays him as a king from a line of kings. The Babylonian king Nabonidus, who was defeated and deposed by Cyrus, is denounced as an impious oppressor of the people of Babylonia and his low-born origins are implicitly contrasted to Cyrus' kingly heritage. The victorious Cyrus is portrayed as having been chosen by the chief Babylonian god Marduk to restore peace and order to the Babylonians. The text states that Cyrus was welcomed by the people of Babylon as their new ruler and entered the city in peace. It appeals to Marduk to protect and help Cyrus and his son Cambyses. It extols Cyrus as a benefactor of the citizens of Babylonia who improved their lives, repatriated displaced people and restored temples and cult sanctuaries across Mesopotamia and elsewhere in the region. It concludes with a description of how Cyrus repaired the city wall of Babylon and found a similar inscription placed there by an earlier king.

The Cylinder's text has traditionally been seen by biblical scholars as corroborative evidence of Cyrus' policy of the repatriation of the Jewish people following their Babylonian captivity (an act that the Book of Ezra attributes to Cyrus), as the text refers to the restoration of cult sanctuaries and repatriation of deported peoples. This interpretation has been disputed, as the text identifies only Mesopotamian sanctuaries, and makes no mention of Jews, Jerusalem, or Judea. Nonetheless, it has been seen as a sign of Cyrus's relatively enlightened approach towards cultural and religious diversity. Neil MacGregor, a former director of the British Museum, said that the cylinder was "the first attempt we know about running a society, a state with different nationalities and faiths – a new kind of statecraft".

In modern times, the Cylinder was adopted as a national symbol of Iran by the ruling Pahlavi dynasty, which put it on display in Tehran in 1971 to commemorate the 2,500-year celebration of the Persian Empire. Princess Ashraf Pahlavi presented Secretary-General of the United Nations U Thant with a replica of the Cylinder. The princess asserted that "the heritage of Cyrus was the heritage of human understanding, tolerance, courage, compassion and, above all, human liberty". Her brother, Shah Mohammad Reza Pahlavi, promoted the Cylinder as the "first charter of human rights", though this interpretation has been described by most historians as "rather anachronistic" and controversial.

== Discovery ==
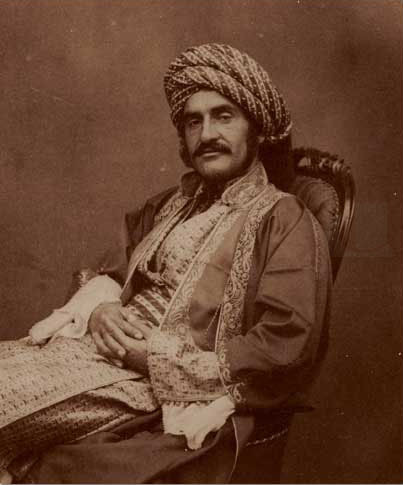
Hormuzd Rassam in Mosul circa 1854. The Cyrus Cylinder was discovered during Rassam's excavations in Babylon in February–March 1879.

The Assyro-British archaeologist Hormuzd Rassam discovered the Cyrus Cylinder in March 1879 during a lengthy programme of excavations in Mesopotamia carried out for the British Museum. It had been placed as a foundation deposit in the foundations of the Ésagila, the city's main temple. Rassam's expedition followed on from an earlier dig carried out in 1850 by the British archaeologist Austen Henry Layard, who excavated three mounds in the same area but found little of importance. In 1877, Layard became Britain's ambassador to the Ottoman Empire, which ruled Mesopotamia at the time. He helped Rassam, who had been his assistant in the 1850 dig, to obtain a firman (decree) from the Ottoman Sultan Abdul Hamid II to continue the earlier excavations. The firman was only valid for a year but a second firman, with much more liberal terms, was issued in 1878. It was granted for two years (through to 15 October 1880) with the promise of an extension to 1882 if required. The Sultan's decree authorised Rassam to "pack and dispatch to England any antiquities [he] found ... provided, however, there were no duplicates". A representative of the Sultan was instructed to be present at the dig to examine the objects as they were uncovered.

With permission secured, Rassam initiated a large-scale excavation at Babylon and other sites on behalf of the Trustees of the British Museum. He undertook the excavations in four distinct phases. In between each phase, he returned to England to bring back his finds and raise more funds for further work. The Cyrus Cylinder was found on the second of his four expeditions to Mesopotamia, which began with his departure from London on 8 October 1878. He arrived in his home town of Mosul on 16 November and travelled down the Tigris to Baghdad, which he reached on 30 January 1879. During February and March, he supervised excavations on a number of Babylonian sites, including Babylon itself.

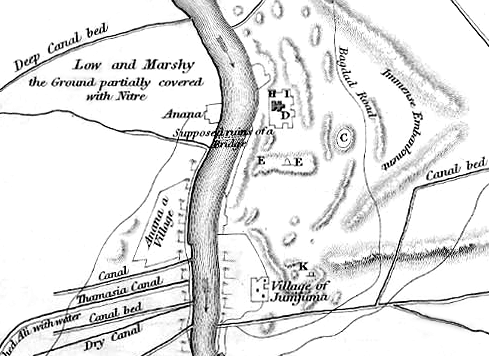
Map of the site of Babylon in 1829. Hormuzd Rassam's diggers found the Cyrus Cylinder in the mound of Tell Amran-ibn-Ali (marked with an "E" at the centre of the map) under which lay the ruined Esagila temple.

He soon uncovered a number of important buildings including the Ésagila temple, a major shrine to the chief Babylonian god Marduk, although its identity was not fully confirmed until the German archaeologist Robert Koldewey's excavation of 1900. The excavators found a large number of business documents written on clay tablets buried in the temple's foundations where they discovered the Cyrus Cylinder. Rassam gave conflicting accounts of where his discoveries were made. He wrote in his memoirs, Asshur and the land of Nimrod, that the Cylinder had been found in a mound at the southern end of Babylon near the village of Jumjuma or Jimjima. However, in a letter sent on 20 November 1879 to Samuel Birch, the Keeper of Oriental Antiquities at the British Museum, he wrote, "The Cylinder of Cyrus was found at Omran [Tell Amran-ibn-Ali] with about six hundred pieces of inscribed terracottas before I left Baghdad." He left Baghdad on 2 April, returning to Mosul and departing from there on 2 May for a journey to London which lasted until 19 June.

The discovery was announced to the public by Sir Henry Rawlinson, the President of the Royal Asiatic Society, at a meeting of the Society on 17 November 1879. He described it as "one of the most interesting historical records in the cuneiform character that has yet been brought to light", though he erroneously described it as coming from the ancient city of Borsippa rather than Babylon. Rawlinson's "Notes on a newly-discovered Clay Cylinder of Cyrus the Great" were published in the society's journal the following year, including the first partial translation of the text.

== Description ==
The Cyrus Cylinder is a barrel-shaped cylinder of baked clay measuring 22.5 centimetres (8.9 in) by 10 centimetres (3.9 in) at its maximum diameter. It was created in several stages around a cone-shaped core of clay within which there are large grey stone inclusions. It was built up with extra layers of clay to give it a cylindrical shape before a fine surface slip of clay was added to the outer layer, on which the text is inscribed. It was excavated in several fragments, having apparently broken apart in antiquity. Today it exists in two main fragments, known as "A" and "B", which were reunited in 1972.

The main body of the Cylinder, discovered by Rassam in 1879, is fragment "A". It underwent restoration in 1961, when it was re-fired and plaster filling was added. The smaller fragment, "B", is a section measuring 8.6 centimetres (3.4 in) by 5.6 centimetres (2.2 in). The latter fragment was acquired by J.B. Nies of Yale University from an antiquities dealer. Nies published the text in 1920. The fragment was apparently broken off the main body of the Cylinder during the original excavations in 1879 and was either removed from the excavations or was retrieved from one of Rassam's waste dumps. It was not confirmed as part of the Cylinder until Paul-Richard Berger of the University of Münster definitively identified it in 1970. Yale University lent the fragment to the British Museum temporarily (but, in practice, indefinitely) in exchange for "a suitable cuneiform tablet" from the British Museum collection.

Although the Cylinder clearly post-dates Cyrus the Great's conquest of Babylon in 539 BC, the date of its creation is unclear. It is commonly said to date to the early part of Cyrus's reign over Babylon, some time after 539 BC. The British Museum puts the Cylinder's date of origin at between 539 and 530 BC.

=== Text ===
The surviving inscription on the Cyrus Cylinder consists of 45 lines of text written in Akkadian cuneiform script. The first 35 lines are on fragment "A" and the remainder are on fragment "B". A number of lines at the start and end of the text are too badly damaged for more than a few words to be legible.

The text is written in an extremely formulaic style that can be divided into six distinct parts:

Extract from the Cyrus Cylinder (lines 15–21), giving the genealogy of Cyrus and an account of his capture of Babylon in 539 BC (E. A. Wallis Budge, 1884).

- Lines 1–19: an introduction reviling Nabonidus, the previous king of Babylon, and associating Cyrus with the god Marduk;
- Lines 20–22: detailing Cyrus's royal titles and genealogy, and his peaceful entry to Babylon;
- Lines 22–34: a commendation of Cyrus's policy of restoring Babylon;
- Lines 34–35: a prayer to Marduk on behalf of Cyrus and his son Cambyses;
- Lines 36–37: a declaration that Cyrus has enabled the people to live in peace and has increased the offerings made to the gods;
- Lines 38–45: details of the building activities ordered by Cyrus in Babylon.

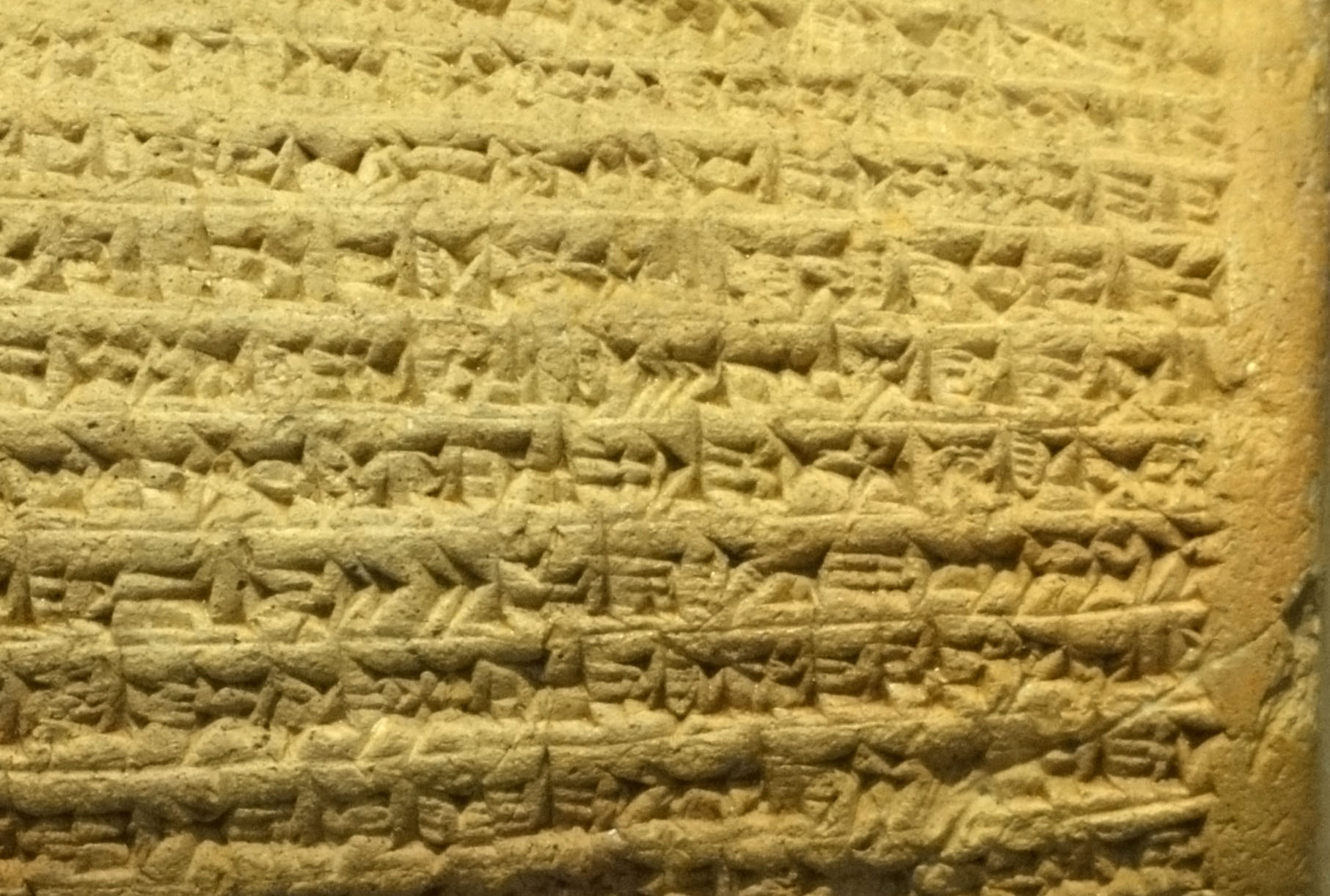
Sample detail image showing cuneiform script.

The beginning of the text is partly broken; the surviving content reprimands the character of the deposed Babylonian king Nabonidus. It lists his alleged crimes, charging him with the desecration of the temples of the gods and the imposition of forced labor upon the populace. According to the proclamation, as a result of these offenses, the god Marduk abandoned Babylon and sought a more righteous king. Marduk called forth Cyrus to enter Babylon and become its new ruler.

In [Nabonidus's] mind, reverential fear of Marduk, king of the gods, came to an end. He did yet more evil to his city every day; … his [people ................…], he brought ruin on them all by a yoke without relief … [Marduk] inspected and checked all the countries, seeking for the upright king of his choice. He took the hand of Cyrus, king of the city of Anshan, and called him by his name, proclaiming him aloud for the kingship over all of everything.

Midway through the text, the writer switches to a first-person narrative in the voice of Cyrus, addressing the reader directly. A list of his titles is given (in a Mesopotamian rather than Persian style): "I am Cyrus, king of the world, great king, powerful king, king of Babylon, king of Sumer and Akkad, king of the four quarters [of the earth], son of Cambyses, great king, king of Anshan, descendant of Teispes, great king, king of Anshan, the perpetual seed of kingship, whose reign Bel [Marduk] and Nebo love, and with whose kingship, to their joy, they concern themselves." He describes the pious deeds he performed after his conquest: he restored peace to Babylon and the other cities sacred to Marduk, freeing their inhabitants from their "yoke", and he "brought relief to their dilapidated housing (thus) putting an end to their (main) complaints". He repaired the ruined temples in the cities he conquered, restored their cults, and returned their sacred images as well as their former inhabitants which Nabonidus had taken to Babylon. Near the end of the inscription Cyrus highlights his restoration of Babylon's city wall, saying: "I saw within it an inscription of Ashurbanipal, a king who preceded me." The remainder is missing but presumably describes Cyrus's rededication of the gateway mentioned.

A partial transcription by F. H. Weissbach in 1911 was supplanted by a much more complete transcription after the identification of the "B" fragment; this is now available in German and in English.

A false translation of the text – affirming, among other things, the abolition of slavery and the right to self-determination, a minimum wage and asylum – has been promoted on the Internet and elsewhere. As well as making claims that are not found on the real cylinder, it refers to the Zoroastrian divinity Ahura Mazda rather than the Mesopotamian god Marduk. The false translation has been widely circulated; alluding to its claim that Cyrus supposedly has stated that "Every country shall decide for itself whether or not it wants my leadership." Iranian Nobel Peace Prize winner Shirin Ebadi in her acceptance speech described Cyrus as "the very emperor who proclaimed at the pinnacle of power 2,500 years ago that … he would not reign over the people if they did not wish it".

=== Associated fragments ===
The British Museum announced in January 2010 that two inscribed clay fragments, which had been in the museum's collection since 1881, had been identified as part of a cuneiform tablet that was inscribed with the same text as the Cyrus Cylinder. The fragments had come from the small site of Dailem near Babylon and the identification was made by Professor Wilfred Lambert, formerly of the University of Birmingham, and Irving Finkel, curator in charge of the museum's Department of the Middle East.

=== Relation to a Chinese bone inscription ===
In 1983 two fossilized horse bones inscribed with cuneiform signs surfaced in China which Professor Oliver Gurney at Oxford later identified as coming from the Cyrus Cylinder. The discovery of these objects aroused much discussion about possible connections between ancient Mesopotamia and China, although their authenticity was doubted by many scholars from the beginning and they are now generally regarded as forgeries.

The history of the putative artifact goes back almost a century. The earliest record goes back to a Chinese doctor named Xue Shenwei, who sometime prior to 1928 was shown a photo of a rubbing of one of the bones by an antiquities dealer named Zhang Yi'an. Although not able to view the bones at that time, Xue Shenwei later acquired one of them from another antiquities dealer named Wang Dongting in 1935 and then the second via a personal connection named Ke Yanling around 1940. While Xue did not recognize the script on the bones he guessed at its antiquity and buried the bones for safekeeping during the Cultural Revolution. Then, in 1983 Xue presented the bones to the Palace Museum in Beijing where Liu Jiuan and Wang Nanfang of the State Administration of Cultural Heritage undertook their study. These officials identified the script as cuneiform and asked the Assyriologists Chi Yang and Wu Yuhong to work on the inscriptions. Identification of the source text proceeded slowly until 1985, when Wu Yuhong along with Oxford Assyriologist Stephanie Dalley and Oliver Gurney recognized the text in one bone as coming from the Cyrus Cylinder. One year later Wu Yuhong presented his findings at the 33rd Rencontre Assyriologique and published them in a journal article.

After that the second bone inscription remained undeciphered until 2010, when Irving Finkel worked on it. In that same year the British Museum held a conference dedicated to the artifacts. Based on the serious textual errors in the inscription, including the omission of a large number of signs from the Cyrus Cylinder, Wu Yuhong argued the inscriptions were most likely copied from the cylinder while housed in the British Museum or from an early modern publication based upon it. However he acknowledged the remote possibility it was copied in late antiquity. Irving Finkel disputed this conclusion based on the relative obscurity of the Cyrus Cylinder until recent decades and the mismatch in paleography between the bone inscriptions and the hand copies found in early editions from the 1880s.

Finally, after the workshop concluded, an 1884 edition of the Cyrus Cylinder by E. A. Wallis Budge came to Irving Finkel's attention. This publication used an idiosyncratic typeface and featured a handcopy for only a section of the whole cylinder. However the typeface in that edition matched the paleography on the bone inscriptions and the extract of the cylinder published in the book matched that of the bone as well. This convinced Finkel that the bone inscriptions were early modern forgeries and that has remained the majority opinion since then.

== Interpretations ==
=== Mesopotamian and Persian tradition and propaganda ===
According to the British Museum, the Cyrus Cylinder reflects a long tradition in Mesopotamia where, from as early as the third millennium BC, kings began their reigns with declarations of reforms. Cyrus's declaration stresses his legitimacy as the king, and is a conspicuous statement of his respect for the religious and political traditions of Babylon. The British Museum and scholars of the period describe it as an instrument of ancient Mesopotamian propaganda.

The text is a royal building inscription, a genre which had no equivalent in Old Persian literature. It illustrates how Cyrus co-opted local traditions and symbols to legitimize his conquest and control of Babylon. Many elements of the text were drawn from long-standing Mesopotamian themes of legitimizing rule in Babylonia: the preceding king is reprimanded and he is proclaimed to have been abandoned by the gods for his wickedness; the new king has gained power through the divine will of the gods; the new king rights the wrongs of his predecessor, addressing the welfare of the people; the sanctuaries of the gods are rebuilt or restored, offerings to the gods are made or increased and the blessings of the gods are sought; and repairs are made to the whole city, in the manner of earlier rightful kings.

Both continuity and discontinuity are emphasized in the text of the Cylinder. It asserts the virtue of Cyrus as a god-fearing king of a traditional Mesopotamian type. On the other hand, it constantly discredits Nabonidus, reviling the deposed king's deeds and even his ancestry and portraying him as an impious destroyer of his own people. As Fowler and Hekster note, this "creates a problem for a monarch who chooses to buttress his claim to legitimacy by appropriating the 'symbolic capital' of his predecessors". The Cylinder's reprimand of Nabonidus also discredits Babylonian royal authority by association. It is perhaps for this reason that the Achaemenid rulers made greater use of Assyrian rather than Babylonian royal iconography and tradition in their declarations; the Cylinder refers to the Assyrian king Ashurbanipal as "my predecessor", rather than any native Babylonian ruler.

The Cylinder itself is part of a continuous Mesopotamian tradition of depositing a wide variety of symbolic items, including animal sacrifices, stone tablets, terracotta cones, cylinders and figures. Newly crowned kings of Babylon would make public declarations of their own righteousness when beginning their reigns, often in the form of declarations that were deposited in the foundations of public buildings. Some contained messages, while others did not, and they had a number of purposes: elaboration of a building's value, commemoration of the ruler or builder and the magical sanctification of the building, through the invocation of divine protection.

The cylinder was not intended to be seen again after its burial, but the text inscribed on it would have been used for public purposes. Archive copies were kept of important inscriptions and the Cylinder's text may likewise have been copied. In January 2010, the British Museum announced that two cuneiform tablets in its collection had been found to be inscribed with the same text as that on the Cyrus Cylinder, which, according to the museum, "show that the text of the Cylinder was probably a proclamation that was widely distributed across the Persian Empire".

==== Similarities with other royal inscriptions ====
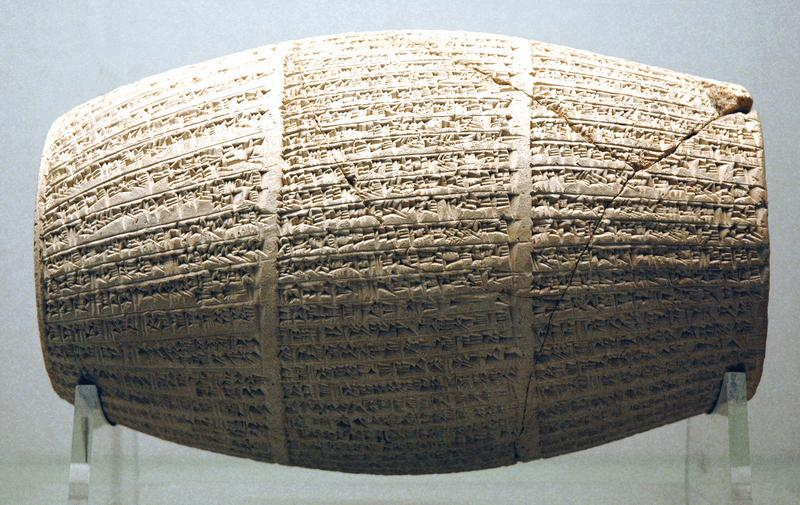
The Nabonidus Cylinder

The Cyrus Cylinder bears striking similarities to older Mesopotamian royal inscriptions. Two notable examples are the Cylinder of Marduk-apla-iddina II, who seized the Babylonian throne in 722/1 BC, and the annals of Sargon II of Assyria, who conquered Babylon twelve years later. As a conqueror, Marduk-apla-iddina faced many of the same problems of legitimacy that Cyrus did when he conquered Babylon. He declares himself to have been chosen personally by Marduk, who ensured his victory. When he took power, he performed the sacred rites and restored the sacred shrines. He states that he found a royal inscription placed in the temple foundations by an earlier Babylonian king, which he left undisturbed and honored. All of these claims also appear in Cyrus's Cylinder. Twelve years later, the Assyrian king Sargon II defeated and exiled Marduk-apla-iddina, taking up the kingship of Babylonia. Sargon's annals describe how he took on the duties of a Babylonian sovereign, honouring the gods, maintaining their temples and respecting and upholding the privileges of the urban elite. Again, Cyrus's Cylinder makes exactly the same points. Nabonidus, Cyrus's deposed predecessor as king of Babylon, commissioned foundation texts on clay cylinders – such as the Cylinder of Nabonidus, also in the British Museum – that follows the same basic formula.

The text of the Cylinder thus indicates a strong continuity with centuries of Babylonian tradition, as part of an established rhetoric advanced by conquerors. As Kuhrt puts it:

[The Cylinder] reflects the pressure that Babylonian citizens were able to bring to bear on the new royal claimant … In this context, the reign of the defeated predecessor was automatically described as bad and against the divine will – how else could he have been defeated? By implication, of course, all his acts became, inevitably and retrospectively, tainted.

The familiarity with long-established Babylonian tropes suggests that the Cylinder was authored by the Babylonian priests of Marduk, working at the behest of Cyrus. It can be compared with another work of around the same time, the Verse Account of Nabonidu, in which the former Babylonian ruler is excoriated as the enemy of the priests of Marduk and Cyrus is presented as the liberator of Babylon. Both works make a point of stressing Cyrus's qualifications as a king from a line of kings, in contrast to the non-royal ancestry of Nabonidus, who is described by the Cylinder as merely maţû, "insignificant".

The Verse Account is so similar to the Cyrus Cylinder inscription that the two texts have been dubbed an example of "literary dependence" – not the direct dependence of one upon the other, but mutual dependence upon a common source. This is characterised by the historian Morton Smith as "the propaganda put out in Babylonia by Cyrus's agents, shortly before Cyrus's conquest, to prepare the way of their lord". This viewpoint has been disputed; as Simon J. Sherwin of the University of Cambridge puts it, the Cyrus Cylinder and the Verse Account are "after the event" compositions which reuse existing Mesopotamian literary themes and do not need to be explained as the product of pre-conquest Persian propaganda.

The German historian Hanspeter Schaudig has identified a line on the Cylinder ("He [i.e. Marduk] saved his city Babylon from its oppression") with a line from tablet VI of the Babylonian "Epic of Creation", Enûma Eliš, in which Marduk builds Babylon. Johannes Haubold suggests that reference represents Cyrus's takeover as a moment of ultimate restoration not just of political and religious institutions, but of the cosmic order underpinning the universe.

==== Analysis of the Cyrus Cylinder's claims ====
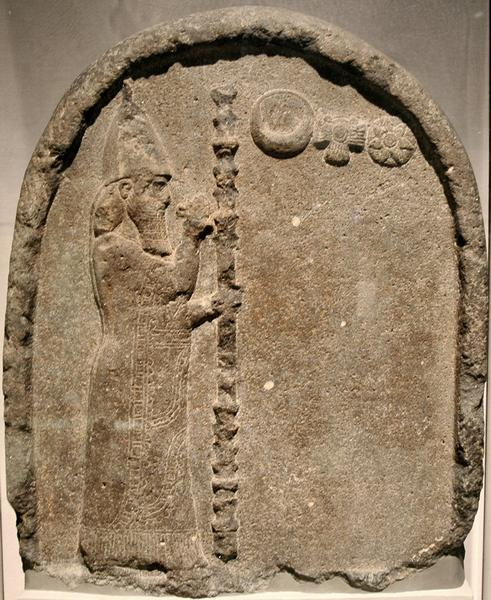
Stele depicting Nabonidus praying to the moon, sun and the planet Venus. The Babylonian king's religious practices were harshly condemned by the Cyrus Cylinder's inscription.

===== Vilification of Nabonidus =====
The Cyrus Cylinder's vilification of Nabonidus is consistent with other Persian propaganda regarding the deposed king's rule. In contrast to the Cylinder's depiction of Nabonidus as an illegitimate ruler who ruined his country, the reign of Nabonidus was largely peaceful, he was recognised as a legitimate king and he undertook a variety of building projects and military campaigns commensurate with his claim to be "the king of Babylon, the universe, and the four corners [of the Earth]".

===== Nabonidus as actually seen in Babylon =====
The Assyriologist Paul-Alain Beaulieu has interpreted Nabonidus's exaltation of the moon god Sin as "an outright usurpation of Marduk's prerogatives by the moon god". Although the Babylonian king continued to make rich offerings to Marduk, his greater devotion to Sin was unacceptable to the Babylonian priestly elite. Nabonidus came from the unfashionable north of Babylonia, introduced foreign gods and went into a lengthy self-imposed exile which was said to have prevented the celebration of the vital New Year festival.

===== Nabonidus as seen in the Harran Stela, contrasted with the Cyrus Cylinder =====
The Harran Stela is generally acknowledged as a genuine document commissioned by Nabonidus. In it, Nabonidus seeks to glorify his own accomplishments, notably his restoration of the Elhulhul Temple, which was devoted to the moon-god Sin. In this regard, the Harran Stela verifies the picture that is dwelt on in the Cyrus Cylinder, that Nabonidus had largely abandoned the homage due to Marduk, chief god of Babylon, in favor of the worship of Sin. Since his mother Addagoppe was apparently a priestess of Sin, or at least a lifelong devotee, this helps explain the unwise political decision regarding Marduk on the part of Nabonidus, a decision that Cyrus takes great advantage of in the Cyrus Cylinder. His mother was also a resident of Harran, which affords another reason why Nabonidus moved there in the third year of his reign (553 BC), at which time he "entrusted the 'Camp' to his oldest (son) [Belshazzar], the first-born . . . He let (everything) go, entrusted the kingship to him."

In at least one respect, however, the Harran Stela is incongruous with the portrayal of events in the Cyrus Cylinder. In the Stela, Nabonidus lists the enemies of Babylon as "the king of Egypt, the Medes and the land of the Arabs, all the hostile kings." The significance of this lies in the date the Stela was composed: According to Paul-Alain Beaulieu, its composition dates to the latter part of the reign of Nabonidus, probably the fourteenth or fifteenth year, i.e. 542–540 BC. The problem with this is that, according to the current consensus view, based largely on the Cyrus Cylinder and later Persian documents that followed in its genre, the Persians should have been named here as a major enemy of Babylon at a time three years or less before the fall of the city to the forces under Cyrus. Nabonidus, however, names the Medes, not the Persians, as a main enemy; as king of the realm he would certainly know who his enemies were. By naming the Medes instead of the Persians, the Harran Stela is more in conformity with the narration of events in Xenophon's Cyropaedia, where Cyrus and the Persians were under the de jure suzerainty of the Medes until shortly after the fall of Babylon, at which time Cyrus, king of Persia, became king of the Medes as well.

A further discussion of the relationship of the Harran Stela (=Babylonian propaganda) to the Cyrus Cylinder (=Persian propaganda) is found in the Harran Stela article, including a discussion of why the Cyrus Cylinder and later Persian texts never name Belshazzar, despite his close association with events associated with the fall of Babylon, as related both in the Bible (Daniel, chapter 5) and in Xenophon's Cyropaedia.

===== Conquest and local support =====
Cyrus's conquest of Babylonia was resisted by Nabonidus and his supporters, as the Battle of Opis demonstrated. Iranologist Pierre Briant comments that "it is doubtful that even before the fall of [Babylon] Cyrus was impatiently awaited by a population desperate for a 'liberator'." However, Cyrus's takeover as king does appear to have been welcomed by some of the Babylonian population. The Judaic historian Lisbeth S. Fried says that there is little evidence that the high-ranking priests of Babylonia during the Achaemenid period were Persians and characterises them as Babylonian collaborators.

The text presents Cyrus as entering Babylon peacefully and being welcomed by the population as a liberator. This presents an implicit contrast with previous conquerors, notably the Assyrian rulers Tukulti-Ninurta I, who invaded and plundered Babylon in the 12th century BC, and Sennacherib, who did the same thing 150 years before Cyrus conquered the region. The massacre and enslavement of conquered people was common practice and was explicitly highlighted by conquerors in victory statements. The Cyrus Cylinder presents a very different message; Johannes Haubold notes that it portrays Cyrus's takeover as a harmonious moment of convergence between Babylonian and Persian history, not a natural disaster but the salvation of Babylonia.

However, the Cylinder's account of Cyrus's conquest clearly does not tell the whole story, as it suppresses any mention of the earlier conflict between the Persians and the Babylonians; Max Mallowan describes it as a "skilled work of tendentious history". The text omits the Battle of Opis, in which Cyrus's forces defeated and apparently massacred Nabonidus's army. Nor does it explain a two-week gap reported by the Nabonidus Chronicle between the Persian entry into Babylon and the surrender of the Esagila temple. Lisbeth S. Fried suggests that there may have been a siege or stand-off between the Persians and the temple's defenders and priests, about whose fate the Cylinder and Chronicle makes no mention. She speculates that they were killed or expelled by the Persians and replaced by more pro-Persian members of the Babylonian priestly elite. As Walton and Hill put it, the claim of a wholly peaceful takeover acclaimed by the people is "standard conqueror's rhetoric and may obscure other facts". Describing the claim of one's own armies being welcomed as liberators as "one of the great imperial fantasies", Bruce Lincoln, Professor of Divinity at the University of Chicago, notes that the Babylonian population repeatedly revolted against Persian rule in 522 BC, 521 BC, 484 BC and 482 BC (though not against Cyrus or his son Cambeses). The rebels sought to restore national independence and the line of native Babylonian kings – perhaps an indication that they were not as favourably disposed towards the Persians as the Cylinder suggests.

===== Restoration of temples =====
The inscription goes on to describe Cyrus returning to their original sanctuaries the statues of the gods that Nabonidus had brought to the city before the Persian invasion. This restored the normal cultic order to the satisfaction of the priesthood. It alludes to temples being restored and deported groups being returned to their homelands but does not imply an empire-wide programme of restoration. Instead, it refers to specific areas in the border region between Babylonia and Persia, including sites that had been devastated by earlier Babylonian military campaigns. The Cylinder indicates that Cyrus sought to acquire the loyalty of the ravaged regions by funding reconstruction, the return of temple properties and the repatriation of the displaced populations. However, it is unclear how much actually changed on the ground; there is no archaeological evidence for any rebuilding or repairing of Mesopotamian temples during Cyrus's reign.

===== Internal policy =====
The Persians' policy towards their subject people, as described by the Cylinder, was traditionally viewed as an expression of tolerance, moderation and generosity "on a scale previously unknown". The policies of Cyrus toward subjugated nations have been contrasted to those of the Assyrians and Babylonians, who had treated subject peoples harshly; he permitted the resettling of those who had been previously deported and sponsored the reconstruction of religious buildings. Cyrus was often depicted positively in Western tradition by sources such as the Old Testament of the Bible and the Greek writers Herodotus and Xenophon. The Cyropaedia of Xenophon was particularly influential during the Renaissance when Cyrus was romanticised as an exemplary model of a virtuous and successful ruler.

Modern historians argue that while Cyrus's behavior was indeed conciliatory, it was driven by the needs of the Persian Empire, and was not an expression of personal tolerance per se. The empire was too large to be centrally directed; Cyrus followed a policy of using existing territorial units to implement a decentralized system of government. The magnanimity shown by Cyrus won him praise and gratitude from those he spared. The policy of toleration described by the Cylinder was thus, as biblical historian Rainer Albertz puts it, "an expression of conservative support for local regions to serve the political interests of the whole [empire]". Another biblical historian, Alberto Soggin, comments that it was more "a matter of practicality and economy … [as] it was simpler, and indeed cost less, to obtain the spontaneous collaboration of their subjects at a local level than to have to impose their sovereignty by force".

===== Differences between the Cyrus Cylinder and previous Babylonian and Assyrian cylinders =====
There are scholars who agree that the Cyrus Cylinder demonstrates a break from past traditions, and the ushering in of a new era. A comparison of the Cyrus Cylinder with the inscriptions of previous conquerors of Babylon highlights this sharply. For instance, when Sennacherib, king of Assyria(705-681 BC) captured the city in 690 BC after a 15-month siege, Babylon endured a dreadful destruction and massacre. Sennacharib describes how, having captured the King of Babylon, he had him tied up in the middle of the city like a pig. Then he describes how he destroyed Babylon, and filled the city with corpses, looted its wealth, broke its gods, burned and destroyed its houses down to foundations, demolished its walls and temples and dumped them in the canals. This is in stark contrast to Cyrus the Great and the Cyrus Cylinder. The past Assyrian, and Babylonian tradition of victor's justice was a common treatment for a defeated people at this time. Sennacherib's tone for instance, reflected his relish of and pride in massacre and destruction, which is totally at odds with the message of the Cyrus Cylinder.

Some scholars believe that no other king ever returned captives to their homes as Cyrus did. Some argue that the Assyrians sometimes gave limited religious freedom to local cults and the people they conquered, interpreting the submission to the "exalted might" of Ashur, the "yoke of Ashur" and the looting and destruction of temples as religious intolerance. Similar actions carried out by Babylonian kings, like the destruction of the temple of Jerusalem as well as the temple in Harran and Nabonidus carrying other gods from their temples to Babylon, were also argued to represent religious intolerance. This is then compared to the Cyrus Cylinder, and argued that it was not a typical declaration that was keeping with the old traditions of the past.

However, Sennacherib's destruction of Babylon can not be taken as the norm, and solely judging from Sennacherib's own inscriptions, the destruction was already bad by Neo-Assyrian standards. The destruction of cult statues has precedence in the Ancient Near East, such as Lugalzagesi claiming to have plundered the shrines and destroyed the cult statues of his enemy state Lagash, but the destruction of cult statues was the more severe and extreme treatment. Nabonidus likely gathered cult statues to Babylon to prepare for an incoming Persian attack, and this tradition has precedence with Merodach-Baladan who also brought the statues to Dur-Yakin to keep them from the Assyrians, and some Babylonian cities also sent their statues to Babylon in 626 BCE in light of Sin-shar-ishkun's advance.

Other scholars disagree with the view that Cyrus had a policy of religious tolerance, which stood in contrast to the Assyrians and Babylonians. This assumes a religious discourse that compelled the ancients to suppress the worship of other gods, but no such discourse existed. Reverence for the gods of Assyria did not prevent the existence of local cults, for example Sargon after his conquest of the Harhar region reconstructed the local temples and returned the statues of the gods. In treaties conducted with vassals, local gods were invoked alongside Assyrian gods in the oath treaties in the curse sections, indicating that the presence of the gods of both parties were required for the oath and the oath treaties never carried a stipulation on the worship of Assyrian gods or the hindrance of worship on local gods. Cogan had concluded that the idea that the cult of Ashur and other Assyrian gods were imposed onto defeated subjects should be rejected, and residents in the annexed provinces were required to provide for the cult of Ashur as they were counted as Assyrian citizens as it was the duty of Assyrian citizens to do so. Kuhrt pointed out that similar to Achaemenid ideology, in Assyrian ideology the acceptance of the power of the Assyrian king was synonymous with the acceptance of the power of their gods, particularly Ashur, and although worship of the Assyrian gods was not forcibly imposed, recognition of Assyrian power entailed the recognition of the superior strength of their gods.

The return of divine statues and people, commonly seen as a special Achaemenid policy, was also attested in Assyrian sources. Esarhaddon, after repairing the statues of the Arabian gods and engraving an inscription to serve as remembrance of Assyria's power, returned the statues on Hazail's request. Accounts on returning statues are also found in the epithets of Esarhaddon. Adad-nirari III claims to have brought back abducted people, and Esarhaddon brought back Babylonians who had been displaced following Sennacherib's destruction of the city to the reconstructed Babylon. Briant summarizes that this view that Cyrus was exceptional only arises if one only takes into account Jewish sources, and the idea disappears if placed in the context of the Ancient Near East.

=== Biblical interpretations ===
Places in Mesopotamia mentioned by the Cyrus Cylinder. Other than Susa, most of the localities it mentions in connection with the restoration of temples were in eastern and northern Mesopotamia, in territories that had been ruled by the deposed Babylonian king Nabonidus.

The Bible records that some Jews returned to their homeland from Babylon, where they had been settled by Nebuchadnezzar, and were given resources to rebuild the temple following an edict from Cyrus. The Book of Ezra (1–4:5) provides a narrative account of the rebuilding project. Scholars have linked one particular passage from the Cylinder to the Old Testament account:

From [?] to Aššur and [from] Susa, Agade, Ešnunna, Zabban, Me-Turnu, Der, as far as the region of Gutium, the sacred centers on the other side of the Tigris, whose sanctuaries had been abandoned for a long time, I returned the images of the gods, who had resided there [i.e., in Babylon], to their places and I let them dwell in eternal abodes. I gathered all their inhabitants and returned to them their dwellings.

Though the Jewish people and their homelands go unnamed, this passage has often been interpreted as a reference to the biblical edicts of repatriation and rebuilding of the temple. The two edicts (one in Hebrew and one in Aramaic) are substantially different in content and tone, leading some historians to argue that one or both may be a post hoc fabrication. The question of their authenticity remains unresolved, though it is widely believed that they do reflect some sort of Persian royal policy, albeit perhaps not one that was couched in the terms given in the text of the biblical edicts.

The dispute over the authenticity of the biblical edicts has prompted interest in this passage from the Cyrus Cylinder, specifically concerning the question of whether it indicates that Cyrus had a general policy of repatriating subject peoples and restoring their sanctuaries. The text of the Cylinder is very specific, listing places in Mesopotamia and the neighboring regions. It does not describe any general release or return of exiled communities but focuses on the return of Babylonian deities to their own home cities. It emphasises the re-establishment of local religious norms, reversing the alleged neglect of Nabonidus – a theme that Amélie Kuhrt describes as "a literary device used to underline the piety of Cyrus as opposed to the blasphemy of Nabonidus". She suggests that Cyrus had simply adopted a policy used by earlier Assyrian rulers of giving privileges to cities in key strategic or politically sensitive regions and that there was no general policy as such. Lester L. Grabbe, a historian of early Judaism, has written that "the religious policy of the Persians was not that different from the basic practice of the Assyrians and Babylonians before them" in tolerating – but not promoting – local cults, other than their own gods.

Cyrus may have seen Jerusalem, situated in a strategic location between Mesopotamia and Egypt, as worth patronising for political reasons. His Achaemenid successors generally supported indigenous cults in subject territories and thereby curried favour with the cults' devotees. Conversely, Persian kings might destroy the shrines of peoples who had rebelled against them, as happened at Miletos in 494 BC following the Ionian Revolt. The Cylinder's text does not describe any general policy of a return of exiles or mention any sanctuary outside Babylonia therein supporting Peter Ross Bedford's argument that the Cylinder is "not a manifesto for a general policy regarding indigenous cults and their worshippers throughout the empire". Amélie Kuhrt notes that "the purely Babylonian context of the Cylinder provides no proof" that Cyrus gave attention to the Jewish exiles or the rebuilding of the Temple in Jerusalem and biblical historian Bob Becking concludes that "it has nothing to do with Judeans, Jews or Jerusalem". Becking also points to the lack of reference to the Jews in surviving Achaemenid texts as an indication that they were not considered of any particular importance.

The German scholar Josef Wiesehöfer summarizes the widely held traditional view by noting that "Many scholars have read into [... the text of Cylinder] a confirmation of the Old Testament passages about the steps taken by Cyrus towards the erection of the Jerusalem temple and the repatriation of the Judaeans" and that this interpretation undergirded a belief "that the instructions to this effect were actually provided in these very formulations of the Cyrus Cylinder".

=== Human rights ===
The interpretation of the Cyrus Cylinder as an early declaration of human rights has been shaped by political commemorations and scholarly debate. In the late 1960s, Mohammad Reza Pahlavi, the last Shah of Iran, promoted it as "the world's first charter of human rights", making it a symbol of Iran's historical heritage. In 2010, Iranian president Mahmoud Ahmadinejad similarly described it as the "First Charter of Human Rights" during an exhibition in Tehran, although his use of the Cylinder attracted criticism from some Iranian politicians.

Some scholars have emphasized how Cyrus's policies of repatriation and religious restoration contrasted with the destructive practices of some earlier conquerors. At the same time, historians examining the Cylinder itself have challenged its characterization as a human rights charter, emphasizing its conventional Mesopotamian form and the absence of an explicit declaration of universal rights, although it describes the return of displaced inhabitants and the restoration of religious sanctuaries.

==== Pahlavi Iranian government's view ====
Cyrus Cylinder at the center of the official emblem of 2,500 year celebration of the Persian Empire at Pahlavi Iranian imperial era

The Cyrus Cylinder was dubbed the "first declaration of human rights" by the pre-Revolution Iranian government, a reading prominently advanced by Shah Mohammed Reza Pahlavi, in a 1967 book, The White Revolution of Iran. The Shah identified Cyrus as a key figure in government ideology and associated his government with the Achaemenids. He wrote that "the history of our empire began with the famous declaration of Cyrus, which, for its advocacy of humane principles, justice and liberty, must be considered one of the most remarkable documents in the history of mankind." The Shah described Cyrus as the first ruler in history to give his subjects "freedom of opinion and other basic rights". In 1968, the Shah opened the first United Nations Conference on Human Rights in Tehran by saying that the Cyrus Cylinder was the precursor to the modern Universal Declaration of Human Rights.

In his 1971 Nowruz (New Year) speech, the Shah declared that 1350 AP (1971–1972) would be Cyrus the Great Year, during which a grand commemoration would be held to celebrate 2,500 years of Persian monarchy. It would serve as a showcase for a modern Iran in which the contributions that Iran had made to world civilization would be recognized. The main theme of the commemoration was the centrality of the monarchy within Iran's political system, associating the Shah of Iran with the famous monarchs of Persia's past, and with Cyrus in particular. The Shah looked to the Achaemenid period as "a moment from the national past that could best serve as a model and a slogan for the imperial society he hoped to create".

The Cyrus Cylinder was adopted as the symbol for the commemoration, and Iranian magazines and journals published numerous articles about ancient Persian history. The British Museum loaned the original Cylinder to the Iranian government for the duration of the festivities; it was put on display at the Shahyad Monument (now the Azadi Tower) in Tehran. The 2,500 year celebrations commenced on October 12, 1971, and culminated a week later with a spectacular parade at the tomb of Cyrus in Pasargadae. On October 14, the shah's sister, Princess Ashraf Pahlavi, presented the United Nations Secretary General U Thant with a replica of the Cylinder. The princess asserted that "the heritage of Cyrus was the heritage of human understanding, tolerance, courage, compassion and, above all, human liberty". The Secretary General accepted the gift, linking the Cylinder with the efforts of the United Nations General Assembly to address "the question of Respect for Human Rights in Armed Conflict". The Cylinder mentions "heavy tribute," bowing down" before the King and his "feet kissing" but the UN probably did not peer-review the text. The "hoax," as Spiegel called it, was translated into six official UN languages. Since then the replica Cylinder has been kept at the United Nations Headquarters in New York City on the second floor hallway. The United Nations continues to promote the cylinder as "an ancient declaration of human rights". Spiegel concludes with the Oriental wisdom: "A fool may throw a stone into a well which a hundred wise men cannot pull out."

==== Reception in the Islamic Republic ====
In September 2010, former Iranian president Mahmoud Ahmadinejad officially opened the Cyrus Cylinder exhibition at the National Museum of Iran. After the Pahlavi era, it was the second time the cylinder was brought to Iran. It was also its longest-running exhibition inside the country. Ahmadinejad considers the Cyrus Cylinder as the incarnation of human values and a cultural heritage for all humanity, and called it the "First Charter of Human Rights". The British Museum had loaned the Cyrus Cylinder to the National Museum of Iran for four months. In the official inauguration, then president of Iran said:

The Cylinder reads that everyone is entitled to freedom of thought and choice and all individuals should pay respect to one another. The historical charter also underscores the necessity of fighting oppression, defending the oppressed, respecting human dignity, and recognizing human rights. The Cyrus Cylinder bears testimony to the fact that the Iranian nation has always been the flag-bearer of justice, devotion and human values throughout history.

— Mahmoud Ahmadinejad during Cyrus Cylinder exhibition at National Museum of Iran

Some Iranian politicians such as MP Ali Motahari criticized Ahmadinejad for bringing the Cyrus Cylinder to Iran, although Tehran daily Kayhan, viewed as an ultra-conservative newspaper, had opined that the Islamic Republic should never have returned the Cyrus Cylinder to Britain (note that the cylinder was not discovered in Iran, but in present-day Iraq):

There is an important question: Doesn't the cylinder belong to Iran? And hasn't the British government stolen ancient artifacts from our country? If the answers to these questions are positive, then why should we return this stolen historical and valuable work to the thieves?

— Kayhan newspaper during Cyrus Cylinder exhibition in Iran

At the time, the Curator of the National Museum of Iran, Azadeh Ardakani, reported approximately 48,000 visitors to the Cylinder exhibition, amongst whom over 2000 were foreigners, including foreign ambassadors.

==== Scholarly views ====
Scholarly assessments of the Cyrus Cylinder have addressed both its disputed characterization as an early declaration of human rights and the broader historical significance of what some scholars describe as Cyrus's relatively accommodating policies toward conquered populations, particularly in comparison with earlier Mesopotamian rulers. The Cylinder's conventional form as a royal inscription does not, in itself, resolve the separate historical question of whether Cyrus's policies represented a significant departure from earlier practices, a subject on which scholars have expressed differing views.

The interpretation of the Cylinder as a "charter of human rights" has been described by various historians as "rather anachronistic" and tendentious. It has been dismissed as a "misunderstanding" and characterized as political propaganda devised by the Pahlavi regime. The German historian Josef Wiesehöfer comments that the portrayal of Cyrus as a champion of human rights is as illusory as the image of the "humane and enlightened Shah of Persia". D. Fairchild Ruggles and Helaine Silverman describe the Shah's aim as being to legitimise the Iranian nation and his own regime, and to counter the growing influence of Islamic fundamentalism by creating an alternative narrative rooted in the ancient Persian past.

Writing in the immediate aftermath of the Shah's anniversary commemorations, the British Museum's C.B.F. Walker comments that the "essential character of the Cyrus Cylinder [is not] a general declaration of human rights or religious toleration but simply a building inscription, in the Babylonian and Assyrian tradition, commemorating Cyrus's restoration of the city of Babylon and the worship of Marduk previously neglected by Nabonidus". Two professors specialising in the history of the ancient Near East, Bill T. Arnold and Piotr Michalowski, comment: "Generically, it belongs with other foundation deposit inscriptions; it is not an edict of any kind, nor does it provide any unusual human rights declaration as is sometimes claimed." Lloyd Llewellyn-Jones of the University of Edinburgh notes that "there is nothing in the text" that suggests the concept of human rights. Neil MacGregor comments:

Comparison by scholars in the British Museum with other similar texts, however, showed that rulers in ancient Iraq had been making comparable declarations upon succeeding to the [Babylonian] throne for two millennia before Cyrus […] it is one of the museum's tasks to resist the narrowing of the object's meaning and its appropriation to one political agenda.

He cautions that while the Cylinder is "clearly linked with the history of Iran," it is "in no real sense an Iranian document: it is part of a much larger history of the ancient Near East, of Mesopotamian kingship, and of the Jewish diaspora". In a similar vein, Qamar Adamjee of the Asian Art Museum describes it as a "very traditional kingship document" and cautions that "it's anachronistic to use 20th century terms to describe events that happened two thousand five hundred years ago."

Separately from debates over the Cylinder's characterization as a human rights declaration, other assessments have emphasized the broader historical significance of the Cylinder and of Cyrus's policies toward conquered populations. The British Museum acknowledges that the Cylinder does not explicitly proclaim human rights, but describes the return of Jewish and other deported populations as "a significant reversal of the policies of earlier Assyrian and Babylonian kings". Shahrokh Razmjou similarly contrasts the Cylinder's emphasis on repatriation and religious restoration with earlier royal inscriptions celebrating conquest and destruction, particularly those of Sennacherib. MacGregor has also described the Cylinder as "the first attempt we know about running a society, a state with different nationalities and faiths – a new kind of statecraft". Other historians, including R. J. van der Spek, have emphasized that the repatriation of displaced peoples and restoration of local cults also had precedents under earlier Assyrian rulers.

== Exhibition history ==
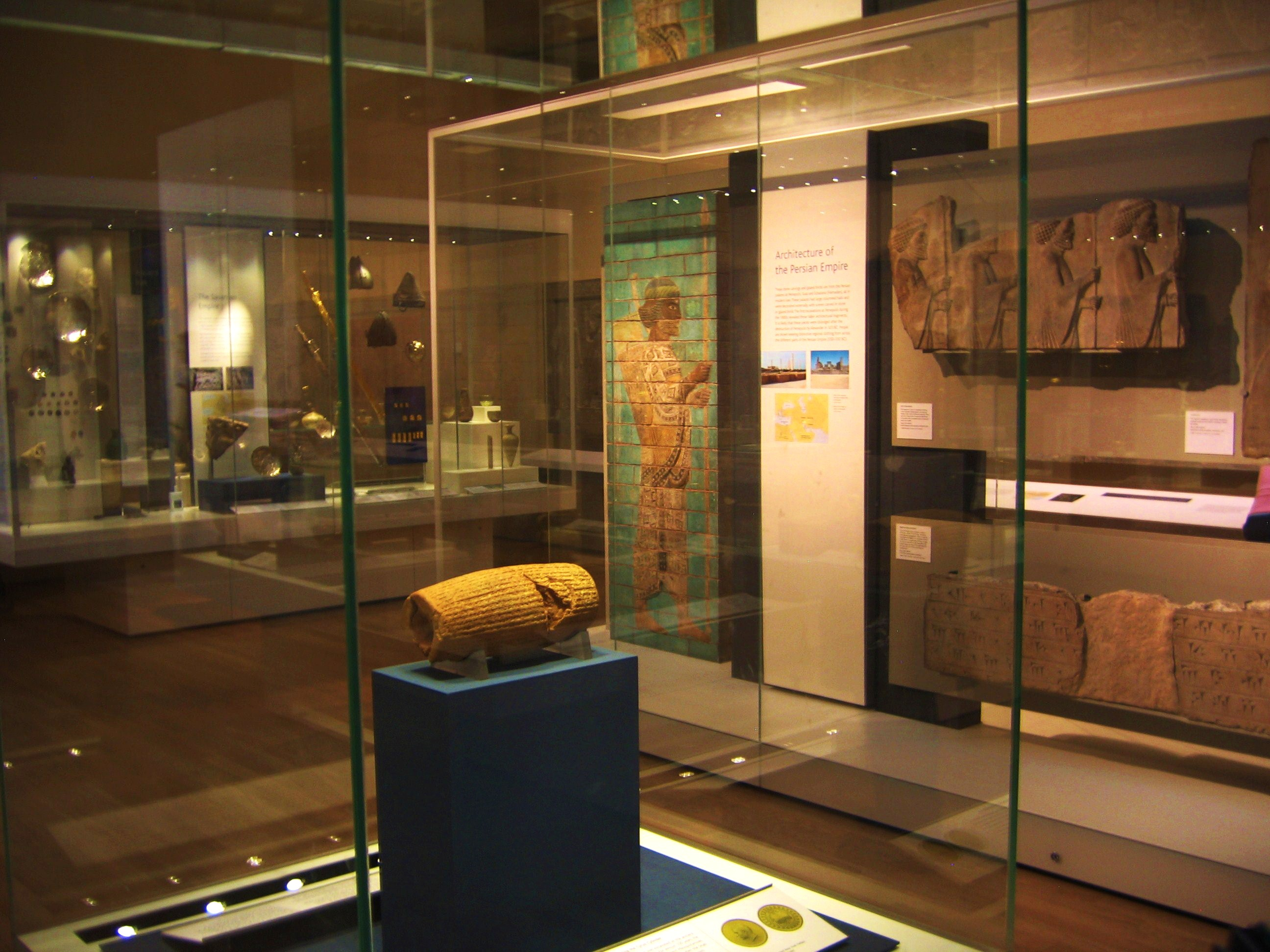
The Cyrus Cylinder in Room 52 of the British Museum in London

The Cyrus Cylinder has been displayed in the British Museum since 1900. It has been loaned five times – twice to Iran, between 7–22 October 1971 in conjunction with the 2,500 year celebration of the Persian Empire and again from September–December 2010, once to Spain from March–June 2006, once to the United States in a traveling exhibition from March–October 2013, and once to the Yale Peabody Museum for their reopening celebrations in May-June 2024. Many replicas have been made. Some were distributed by the Shah following the 1971 commemorations, while the British Museum and National Museum of Iran have sold them commercially.

The British Museum's ownership of the Cyrus Cylinder has been the cause of some controversy in Iran, although the artifact was obtained legally and was not excavated on Iranian soil but on former Ottoman territory (modern Iraq). When it was loaned in 1971, the Iranian press campaigned for its transfer to Iranian ownership. The Cylinder was brought back to London without difficulty, but the British Museum's Board of Trustees subsequently decided that it would be "undesirable to make a further loan of the Cylinder to Iran."

In 2005–2006 the British Museum mounted a major exhibition on the Persian Empire, Forgotten Empire: the World of Ancient Persia. It was held in collaboration with the Iranian government, which loaned the British Museum a number of iconic artifacts in exchange for an understanding that the Cyrus Cylinder would be loaned to the National Museum of Iran in return.

The planned loan of the Cylinder was postponed in October 2009 following the June 2009 Iranian presidential election so that the British Museum could be "assured that the situation in the country was suitable". In response, the Iranian government threatened to end cooperation with the British Museum if the Cylinder was not loaned within the following two months. This deadline was postponed despite appeals by the Iranian government but the Cylinder did eventually go on display in Tehran in September 2010 for a four-month period. The exhibition was very popular, attracting 48,000 people within the first ten days and about 500,000 people by the time it closed in January 2011. However, at its opening, Iranian president Mahmoud Ahmadinejad mingled Islamic Republican and ancient Persian symbology, which commentators inside and outside Iran criticised as an overt appeal to religious nationalism.

On November 28, 2012, the BBC announced the first United States tour of the Cylinder. Under the headline "British Museum lends ancient 'bill of rights' cylinder to US", Museum director Neil MacGregor declared that "The cylinder, often referred to as the first bill of human rights, 'must be shared as widely as possible'". The British Museum itself announced the news in its press release, saying "'First declaration of human rights' to tour five cities in the United States". According to the British Museum's website for the Cylinder's US exhibition "CyrusCylinder2013.com", the tour started in March 2013 and included Washington D.C.'s Smithsonian's Arthur M. Sackler Gallery, the Museum of Fine Arts in Houston, the Metropolitan Museum of Art in New York, the Asian Art Museum in San Francisco and culminated at the J. Paul Getty Museum in Los Angeles, in October 2013.

The cylinder, along with thirty two other associated objects from the British Museum collection, including a pair of gold armlets from the Oxus Treasure and the Darius Seal, were part of an exhibition titled 'The Cyrus Cylinder and Ancient Persia – A New Beginning' at the Prince of Wales Museum in Mumbai, India, from December 21, 2013, to February 25, 2014. It was organised by the British Museum and the Prince of Wales Museum in partnership with Sir Dorabji Tata Trust, Sir Ratan Tata Trust and Navajbai Ratan Tata Trust, all set up by luminaries from the Parsi community, who are descendants of Persian Zoroastrians, who hold Cyrus in great regard, as many scholars consider him as a follower of Zoroastrianism. The cylinder was on display through June 2024 at the Yale Peabody Museum in New Haven CT to celebrate their reopening

== The Freedom Sculpture ==
The Freedom Sculpture or Freedom: A Shared Dream (Persian: تندیس آزادی) is a 2017 stainless steel public art sculpture by artist and architect Cecil Balmond, located in Century City, California, and modeled on the Cyrus Cylinder.

== See also ==
- Cyrus's edict
- Behistun inscriptions
- History of human rights
- Persepolis Fortification Archive
