= Ezra 1 =

First chapter of the Book of Ezra

- ← 2 Chronicles 36 chapter 2 →
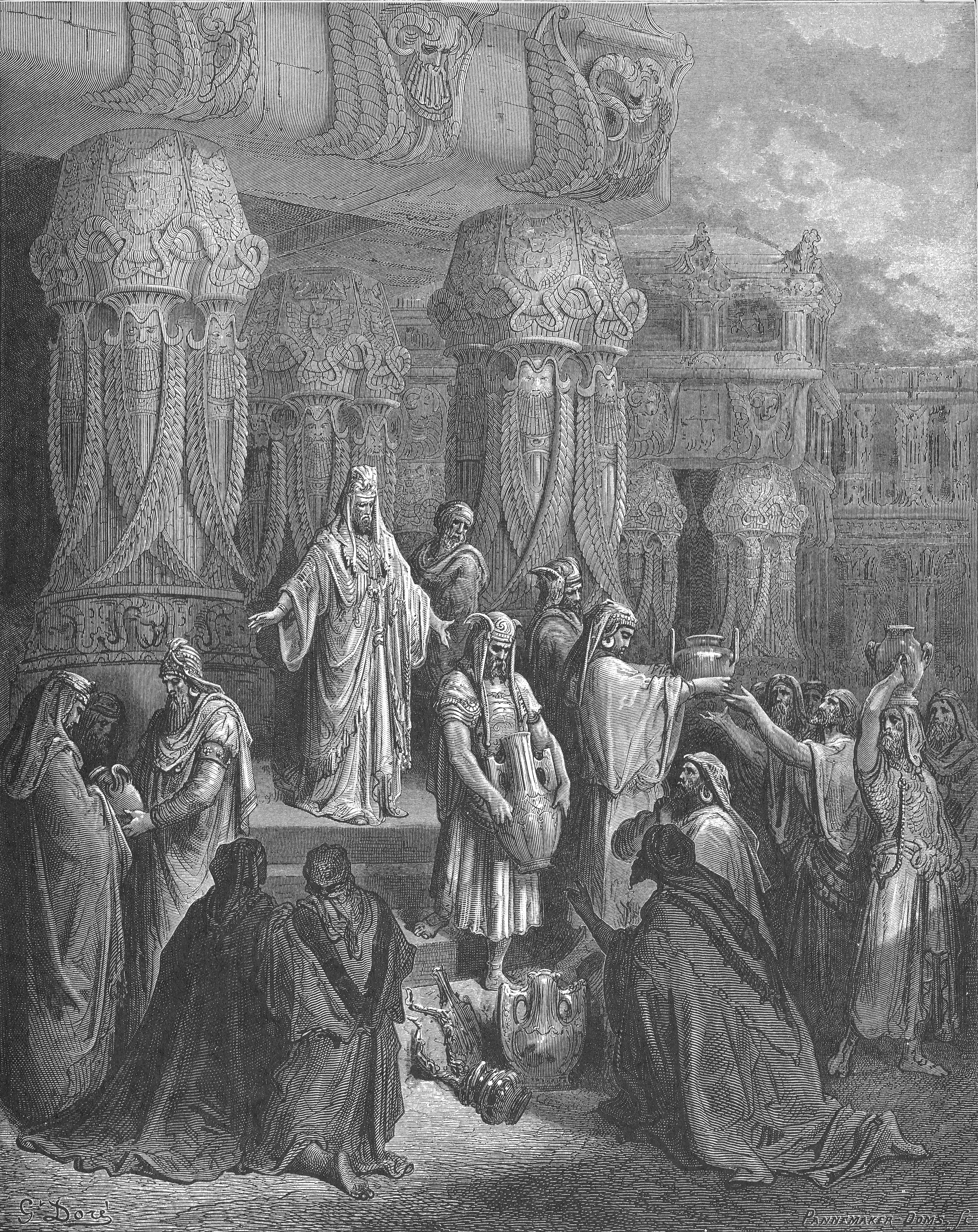
- Cyrus Restores the Vessels of the Temple (Ezra 1:1–11)
- Book: Book of Ezra
- Category: Ketuvim
- Christian Bible part: Old Testament
- Order in the Christian part: 15

Ezra 1 is the first chapter of the Book of Ezra in the Old Testament of the Christian Bible, or the book of Ezra–Nehemiah in the Hebrew Bible, which treats the book of Ezra and book of Nehemiah as one book. Jewish tradition states that Ezra is the author of Ezra–Nehemiah as well as the Book of Chronicles, but modern scholars generally believe that a compiler from the 5th century BCE (the so-called "Chronicler") is the final author of these books.

Ezra 1 contains a narrative of the Edict of Cyrus and the initial return of exiles to Judah led by Sheshbazzar as well as the restoration of the sacred temple vessels. It also introduces the section comprising chapters 1 to 6 describing the history before the arrival of Ezra in the land of Judah in 468 BCE. The opening sentence of this chapter (and this book) is identical to the final sentence of 2 Chronicles.

== Cyrus Cylinder ==
The Cyrus Cylinder contains a statement related to the Cyrus's edict which gives the historical background to the Book of Ezra:

I returned the images of the gods, who had resided there [i.e., in Babylon], to their places and I let them dwell in eternal abodes. I gathered all their inhabitants and returned to them their dwellings.

Cyrus's edict is significant to the return of the Jews, because it shows that they did not slip away from Babylon but were given official permission by the Persian king in the first year of his rule, and it is a specific fulfillment of the seventy years prophecy of Jeremiah (Jeremiah 25:11–14, Jeremiah 29:10–14).

== Text ==
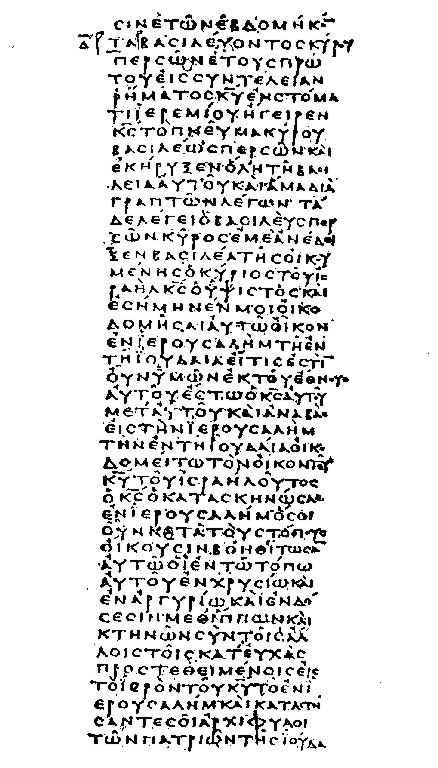
Right column of p. 575 of the Greek Uncial manuscript Codex Vaticanus (4th century AD), from the Vatican Library, containing 1 Esdras 1:55–2:5.

The text is written in Biblical Hebrew and divided into 11 verses.

=== Textual witnesses ===
There is a translation into Koine Greek known as the Septuagint, made in the last few centuries BCE. Extant ancient manuscripts of the Septuagint version include Codex Vaticanus (B; $\mathfrak{G}$^{B}; 4th century), and Codex Alexandrinus (A; $\mathfrak{G}$^{A}; 5th century). (Note: The extant Codex Sinaiticus only contains Ezra 9:9–10:44.)

An ancient Greek book called 1 Esdras (Greek: Ἔσδρας Αʹ) containing some parts of 2 Chronicles, Ezra and Nehemiah is included in most editions of the Septuagint and is placed before the single book of Ezra–Nehemiah (which is titled in Greek: Ἔσδρας Βʹ). 1 Esdras 2:1–14 is the equivalent of Ezra 1:1–11 (Cyrus's edict).

An early manuscript containing the text of this chapter in Biblical Hebrew is the Codex Leningradensis (1008 CE). Since the anti-Jewish riots in Aleppo in 1947, the whole book of Ezra–Nehemiah has been missing from the text of the Aleppo Codex.

== Biblical narrative ==
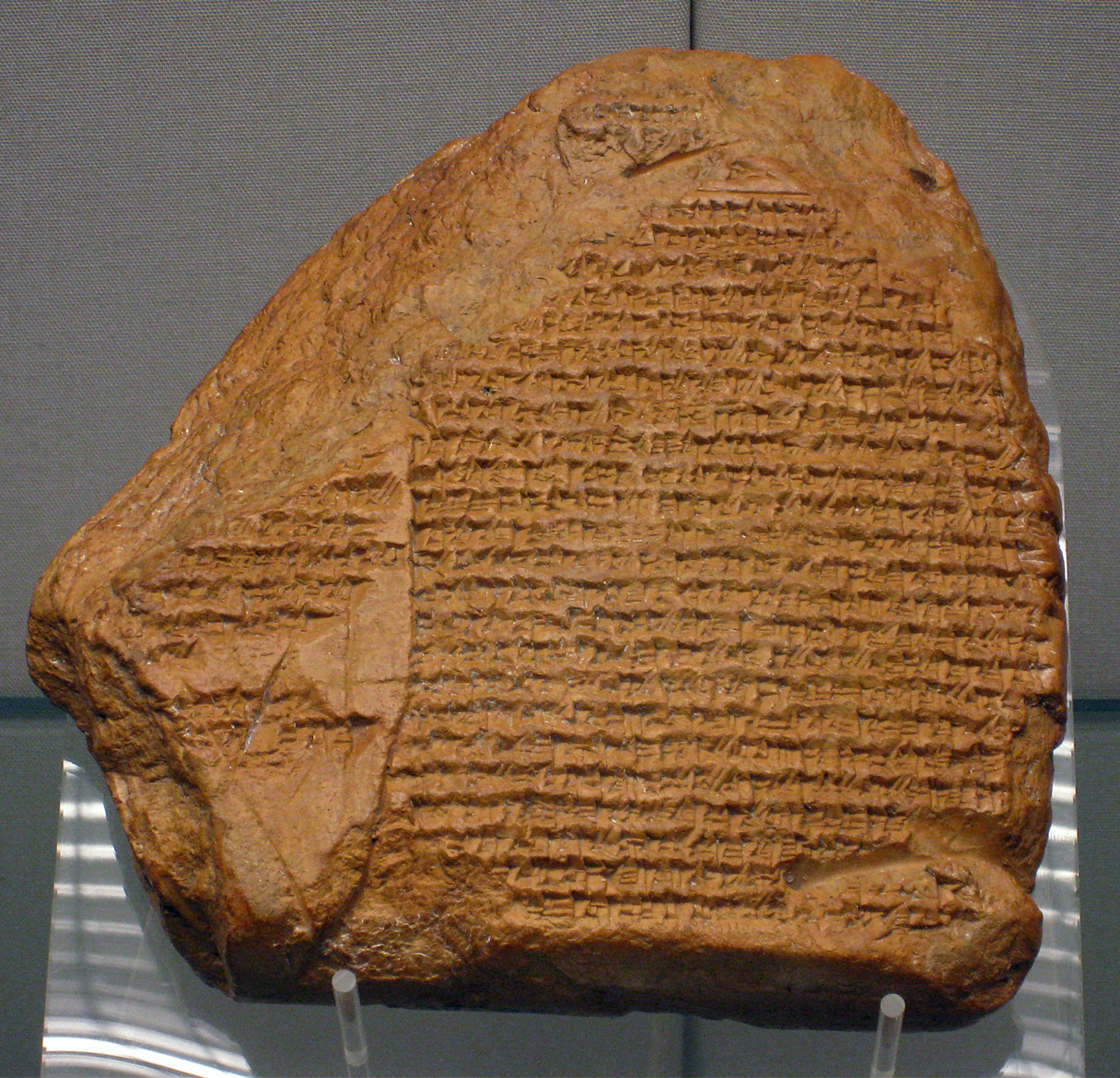
The Nabonidus Chronicle, which contains the title of Cyrus as the "king of Persia".

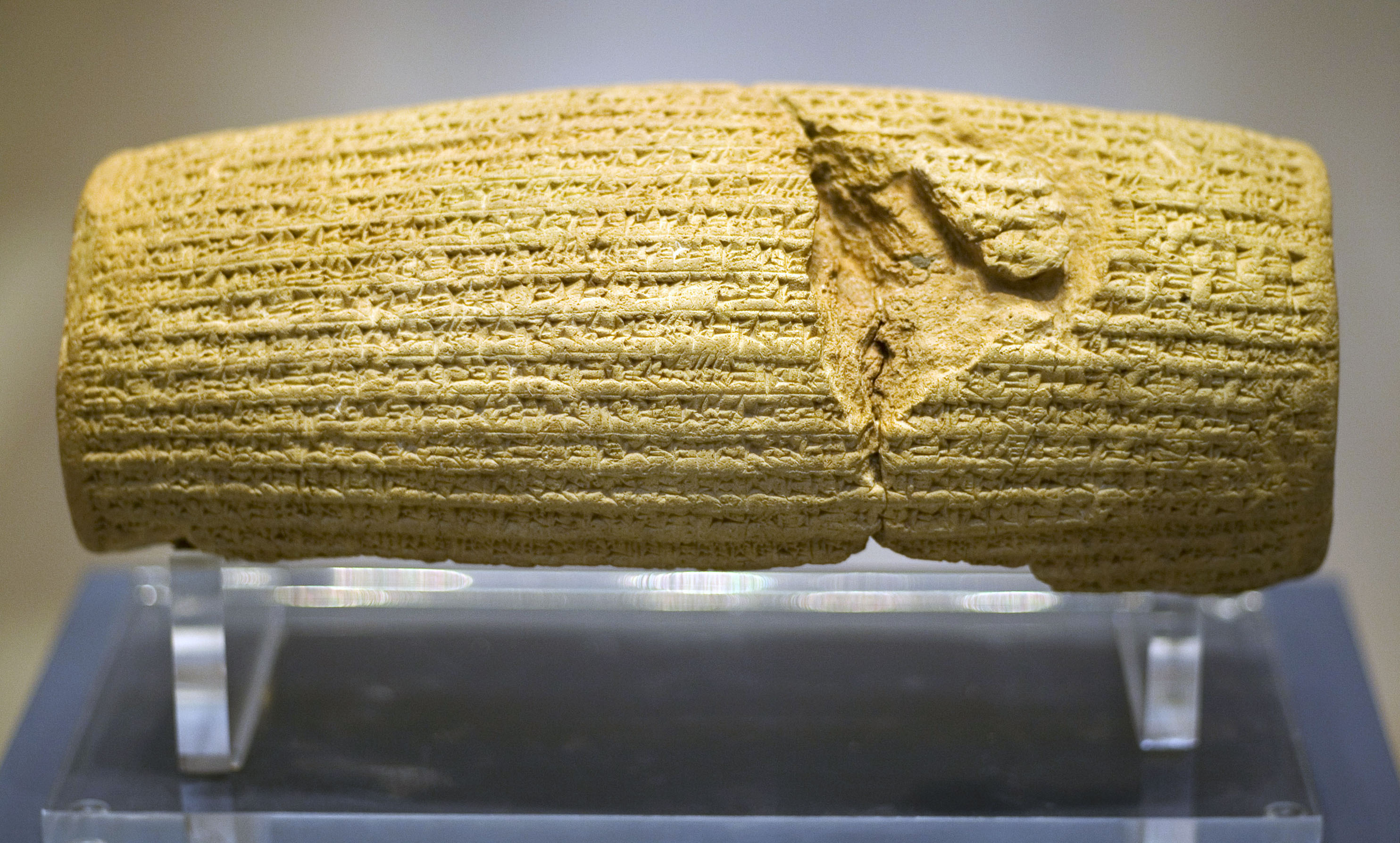
Front of the Cyrus Cylinder, containing inscription similar to the Cyrus's edict.

Ezra 1 starts by providing historical context of a real event: "the first year of Cyrus king of Persia", but immediately follows with the statement about Yahweh, who has the real control and even already speaks about this event before the birth of Cyrus (Isaiah 44:28; 45:13) and the fulfillment of his word through Jeremiah.

=== Verse 1 ===
Now in the first year of Cyrus king of Persia, that the word of the Lord by the mouth of Jeremiah might be fulfilled, the Lord stirred up the spirit of Cyrus king of Persia, that he made a proclamation throughout all his kingdom, and put it also in writing, saying,

=== Verse 2 ===
Thus says Cyrus king of Persia: The Lord God of heaven has given me all the kingdoms of the earth, and He has charged me to build Him a house at Jerusalem, which is in Judah.

=== Verse 3 ===
Who is there among you of all his people? his God be with him, and let him go up to Jerusalem, which is in Judah, and build the house of the Lord God of Israel, (he is the God,) which is in Jerusalem.

=== Verse 4 ===
And whoever is left in any place where he dwells, let the men of his place help him with silver and gold, with goods and livestock, besides the freewill offerings for the house of God which is in Jerusalem.

=== Verse 7 ===
Also Cyrus the king brought forth the vessels of the house of the Lord, which Nebuchadnezzar had brought forth out of Jerusalem, and had put them in the house of his gods;

The Temple treasures that Nebuchadnezzar took away (2 Chronicles 36:18) are now to be returned to Jerusalem.

=== Verse 11 ===
In all, there were 5,400 articles of gold and of silver. Sheshbazzar brought all these along with the exiles when they came up from Babylon to Jerusalem.

The equivalent verse in 1 Esdras (verse 14) numbers these articles as 5469.

== See also ==
- Cyrus the Great in the Bible
- Jerusalem
- Mithredath
- Zerubbabel
- Related Bible parts: 2 Chronicles 36, Isaiah 44, Isaiah 45, Jeremiah 25, Jeremiah 29, Jeremiah 51

== Sources ==
- Dandamaev, M. A. (1989). A Political History of the Achaemenid Empire. Leiden: Brill. ISBN 90-04-09172-6.
- Fensham, F. Charles (1982). The Books of Ezra and Nehemiah. New international commentary on the Old Testament (illustrated ed.). Wm. B. Eerdmans Publishing. ISBN 978-0802825278.
- Grabbe, Lester L. (2003). "Ezra". In Dunn, James D. G.; Rogerson, John William (eds.). Eerdmans Commentary on the Bible (illustrated ed.). Wm. B. Eerdmans Publishing. pp. 313–319. ISBN 978-0802837110.
- Halley, Henry H. (1965). Halley's Bible Handbook: an abbreviated Bible commentary (24th (revised) ed.). Zondervan Publishing House. ISBN 0-310-25720-4.
- Hallo, W.H.; Younger, K.L., eds. (2003). The Context of Scripture: Monumental Inscriptions from the Biblical World. Translated by Cogan, Mordechai. Leiden: Brill. ISBN 978-90-04-10619-2.
- Brosius, Maria (ed.), The Persian Empire from Cyrus II to Artaxerxes I (2000, London Association of Classical Teachers (LACT) 16, London.
- Larson, Knute; Dahlen, Kathy; Anders, Max E. (2005). Anders, Max E. (ed.). Holman Old Testament Commentary - Ezra, Nehemiah, Esther. Vol. 9 (illustrated ed.). B&H Publishing Group. ISBN 978-0805494693.
- Levering, Matthew (2007). Ezra & Nehemiah. Brazos Theological Commentary on the Bible. Brazos Press. ISBN 978-1587431616.
- McConville, J. G. (1985). Ezra, Nehemiah, and Esther. The daily study Bible : Old Testament. Westminster John Knox Press. ISBN 978-0664245832.
- Schaudig, Hanspeter (2001). Die Inschriften Nabonids von Babylon und Kyros' des Großen, samt den in ihrem Umfeld entstandenen Tendenzschriften. Textausgabe und Grammatik (in German). Münster: Ugarit-Verlag.
- Smith-Christopher, Daniel L. (2007). "15. Ezra-Nehemiah". In Barton, John; Muddiman, John (eds.). The Oxford Bible Commentary (first (paperback) ed.). Oxford University Press. pp. 308–324. ISBN 978-0199277186.
- Würthwein, Ernst (1995). The Text of the Old Testament. Translated by Rhodes, Erroll F. Grand Rapids, MI: Wm. B. Eerdmans. ISBN 0-8028-0788-7.
