= Book of Ezra =

Book of the Bible

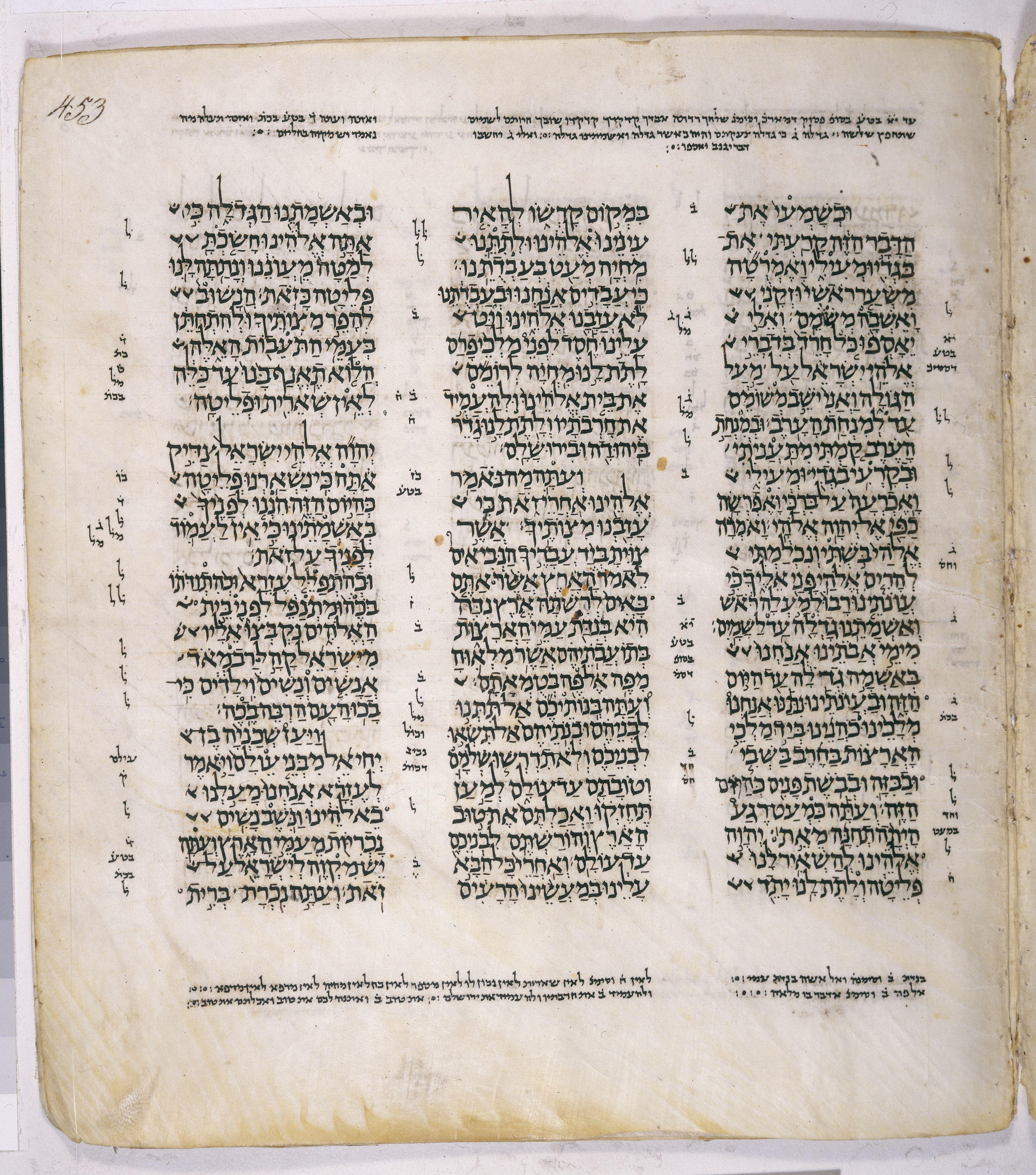
Page from the Leningrad Codex (1008 CE) showing Ezra 9:3–10:3 in Hebrew. Includes the passage, "for a brief moment, the Lord our God has been gracious in leaving us a remnant and giving us a firm place in his sanctuary, […] Though we are slaves, our God has not forsaken us in our bondage. He has shown us kindness in the sight of the kings of Persia: He has granted us new life to rebuild the house of our God and repair its ruins, and he has given us a wall of protection in Judah and Jerusalem." (NIV)

The Book of Ezra (Hebrew: ספר עזרא, romanized: Sêfer ‘Ezrā) is a book of the Hebrew Bible which formerly included the Book of Nehemiah in a single book, commonly distinguished in scholarship as Ezra–Nehemiah. The two became separated with the first printed rabbinic bibles of the early 16th century, following late medieval Latin Christian tradition. Composed in Hebrew and Aramaic, its subject is the Return to Zion following the close of the Babylonian captivity. Together with the Book of Nehemiah, it represents the final chapter in the historical narrative of the Hebrew Bible.

The Book of Ezra is divided into two parts: the first telling the story of the first return of exiles in the first year of Cyrus the Great (538 BC) and the completion and dedication of the new Temple in Jerusalem in the sixth year of Darius I (515 BC); the second telling of the subsequent mission of Ezra to Jerusalem and his struggle to purify the Jews from marriage with non-Jews.

In the book's recurring narrative pattern, the God of Israel three times inspires a king of Persia to commission a leader from among the Jews to carry out a mission: the first to rebuild the Temple, the second to purify the Jewish community, and the third to seal the holy city behind a wall. This third mission, that of Nehemiah, is not part of the Book of Ezra.

There is no historical consensus on Ezra's existence or mission due to a lack of extrabiblical evidence and conflicting scholarly interpretations, ranging from viewing him as a historical Aramean official to a literary figure, with debates hinging on the authenticity of the Artaxerxes rescript and its dating.

== Summary ==
The Book of Ezra consists of ten chapters: chapters 1–6, covering the period from the decree of Cyrus the Great to the dedication of the Second Temple, are told in the third person. Chapters 7–10, dealing with the mission of Ezra, are told largely in the first person. The book contains several documents presented as historical inclusions, written in Aramaic while the surrounding text is in Hebrew (1:2–4, 4:8–16, 4:17–22, 5:7–17, 6:3–5, 6:6–12, 7:12–26).

Chapters 1–6 (documents included in the text in italics)

- 1. Decree of Cyrus, first version: Cyrus, inspired by God, returns the Temple vessels to Sheshbazzar, "prince of Judah", and directs the Israelites to return to Jerusalem with him and rebuild the Temple.
- 2. 42,360 exiles, with men servants, women servants and "singing men and women", return from Babylon to Jerusalem and Judah under the leadership of Zerubbabel and Jeshua the High Priest.
- 3. Jeshua the High Priest and Zerubbabel build the altar and celebrate the Feast of Tabernacles. In the second year the foundations of the Temple are laid and the dedication takes place with great rejoicing.

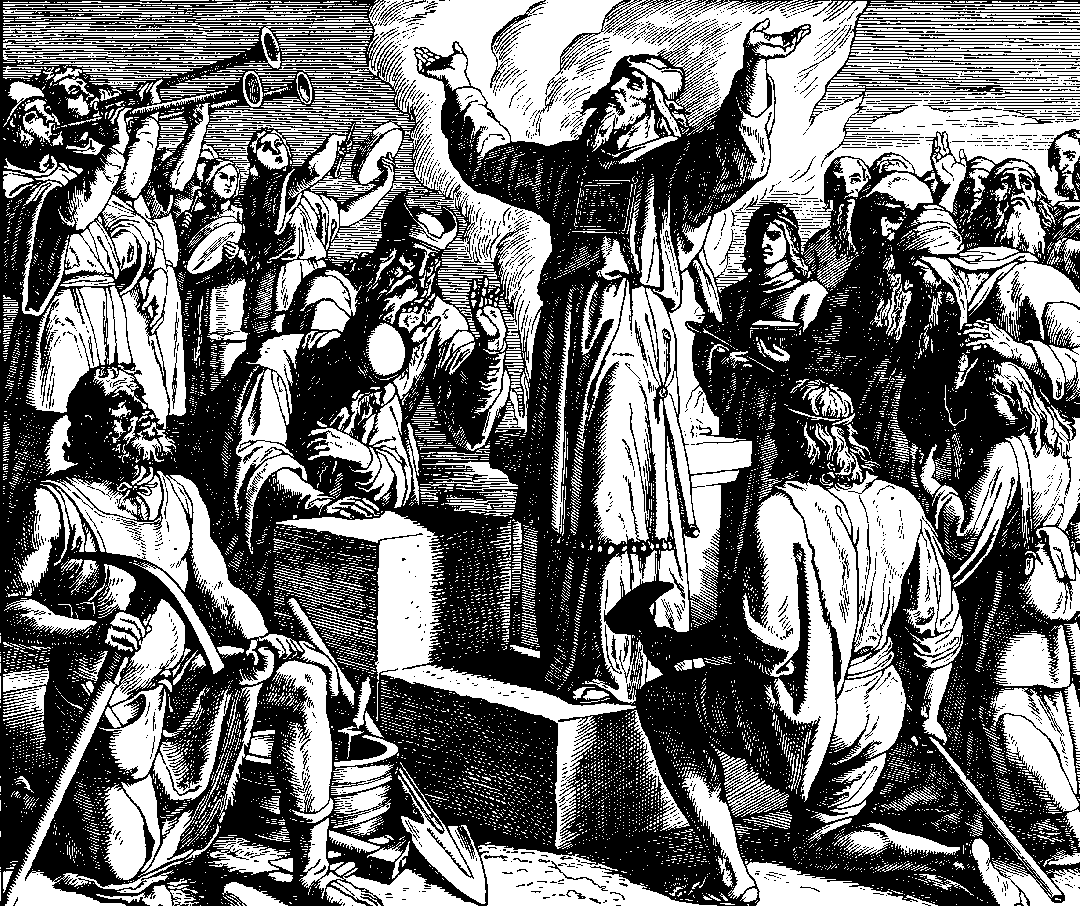
Ezra calls for the rebuilding of the temple in this 1860 woodcut by Julius Schnorr von Karolsfeld

- 4. Samaritans offer to help with the rebuilding, but are rebuffed; they then work to frustrate the builders "down to the reign of Darius". Complaints against the Jews under King Xerxes and Artaxerxes I. Letter of officials to Artaxerxes, and reply of Artaxerxes: The officials "beyond the river" write to Artaxerxes warning him that Jerusalem is being rebuilt, and the king orders the work to stop. The narrative then returns to the times of Darius I. "Thus the work on the house of God in Jerusalem came to a standstill until the second year of the reign of Darius king of Persia."
- 5. Tattenai's letter to Darius: Through the exhortations of the prophets Haggai and Zechariah, Zerubbabel and Joshua recommence the building of the Temple. Tattenai, satrap over both Judah and Samaria, writes to Darius warning him that Jerusalem is being rebuilt and advising that the archives be searched to discover the decree of Cyrus.
- 6. Decree of Cyrus, second version, and decree of Darius: Darius finds the decree, directs Tattenai not to disturb the Jews in their work, and exempts them from tribute and supplies everything necessary for the offerings. The Temple is finished in the month of Adar in the sixth year of Darius, and the Israelites assemble to celebrate its completion.

Chapters 7–10

- 7. Letter of Artaxerxes to Ezra (Artaxerxes' rescript): King Artaxerxes is moved by God to commission Ezra "to inquire about Judah and Jerusalem with regard to the Law of your God" and to "appoint magistrates and judges to administer justice to all the people of Trans-Euphrates—all who know the laws of your God." Artaxerxes gives Ezra much gold and directs all Persian officials to aid him.

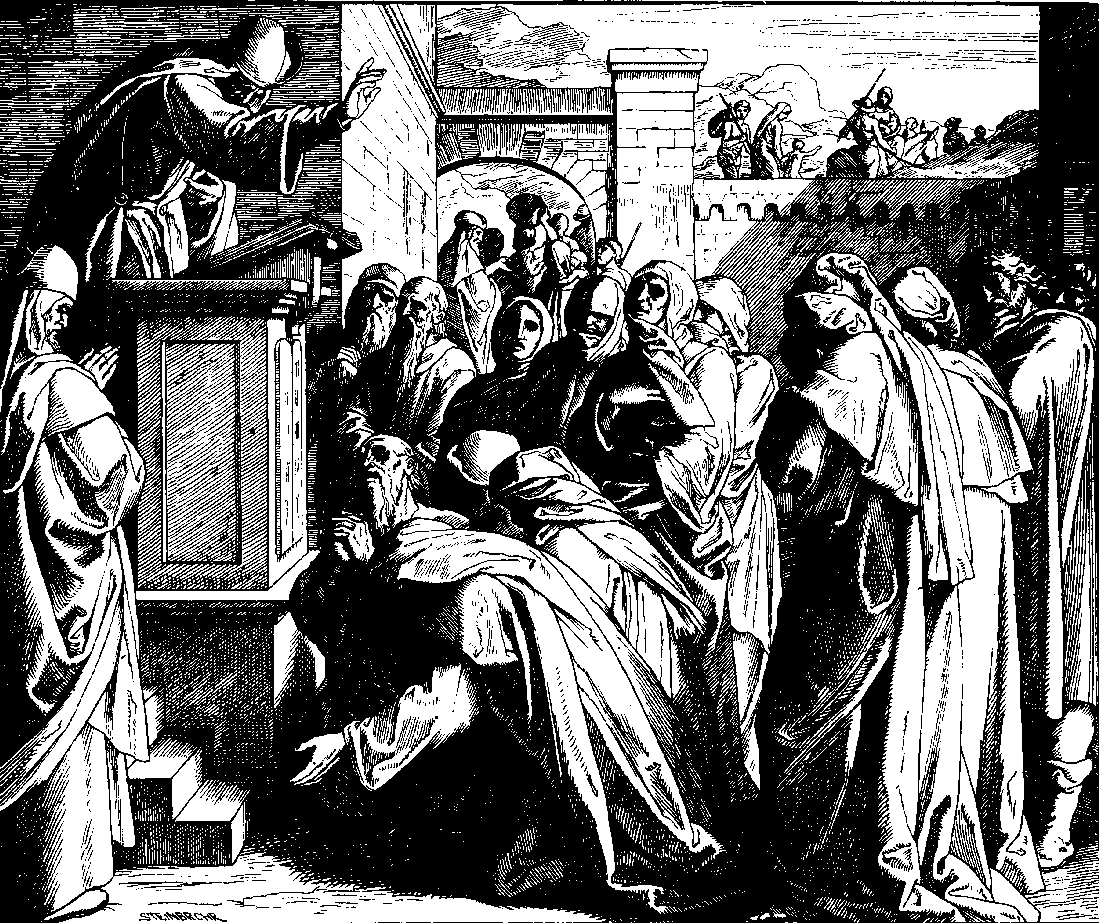
Ezra reads the Law in this 1860 woodcut by Julius Schnorr von Karolsfeld

- 8. Ezra gathers a large body of returnees and much gold and silver and precious vessels for the Temple and camps by a canal outside Babylon. There he discovers he has no Levites, and so sends messengers to gather some. The exiles then return to Jerusalem, where they distribute the gold and silver and offer sacrifices to God.
- 9. Ezra is informed that some of the Jews already in Jerusalem have married non-Jewish women. Ezra is appalled at this proof of sin, and prays to God: "O God of Israel, you are righteous! We are left this day as a remnant. Here we are before you in our guilt, though because of it not one of us can stand in your presence."
- 10. Despite the opposition of some of their number, the Israelites assemble and send away their foreign wives and children.

== Historical background ==
In the early 6th century BC, the Kingdom of Judah rebelled against the Neo-Babylonian Empire and was destroyed. As a result, the royal court, the priests, the prophets, and the scribes were taken into captivity in the city of Babylon. There, a profound intellectual revolution took place, the exiles blaming their fate on disobedience to their God and looking forward to a future when he would allow a purified people to return to Jerusalem and rebuild the Temple in Jerusalem. The same period saw the rapid rise of Persia, previously an unimportant kingdom in present-day southern Iran, to a position of great power, and in 539 BC Cyrus II, the Persian ruler, conquered Babylon.

It is difficult to describe the parties and politics of Judea in this period because of the lack of historical sources, but there seem to have been three important groups involved: the returnees from the exile who claimed the reconstruction with the support of Cyrus II; "the adversaries of Judah and Benjamin"; and a third group, "people of the land", who seem to be local opposition against the returnees building the Temple in Jerusalem.

The following table is a guide to major events in the region during the period covered by the Book of Ezra:

King of Persia	Reign (BC)	Main events	Correlation with Ezra–Nehemiah
Cyrus II	550[?]–530	539 BC Fall of Babylon	Directive to the Jews to rebuild the Temple and first return of the exiles to Jerusalem (taken as occurring in 538, since Babylon fell in October 539)
Cambyses	530–522	525 Conquest of Egypt	
Darius I	522–486	Secures the throne in 520/519 after fighting off various rivals; failed punitive invasion of Greece	515 Temple rebuilt.
Xerxes	486–465	Failed attempt to conquer Greece; beginning of struggle with Greeks for control of the eastern Mediterranean	According to Ezra 4:6, Xerxes (biblical Ahasuerus) received complaints from the Samaritans against the inhabitants of Yehud in the context of the enmities between the two groups.
Artaxerxes I	465–424	460–456 Successful suppression of Greek-supported revolt in Egypt; 449 Revolt by Megabyzus, governor of the territory which included Judah	Currently most widely accepted period for arrival of Ezra "in the seventh year of Artaxerxes"; Second return of the exiles to Jerusalem (in 458 if the king is Artaxerxes I, or 428 if the year is read as his thirty-seventh instead of his seventh); 445–433 Nehemiah's mission (returns before the death of Artaxerxes)
Darius II	423–404	414–404 Persia intervenes in the Peloponnesian War on the Spartan side	(Alternative) Temple rebuilt.
Artaxerxes II	404–358	401 Egypt regains independence	(Alternative) period for arrival of Ezra and second return of exiles to Jerusalem (in 398 if the king is Artaxerxes II)
Artaxerxes III	358–338	Egypt reconquered	
Darius III	336–330	The Achaemenid Empire conquered by Alexander the Great	

== Texts ==
=== Ezra–Nehemiah ===
The single Hebrew book Ezra–Nehemiah, with title "Ezra", was translated into Greek around the middle of the 2nd century BC. The Septuagint names Ezra–Nehemiah and 1 Esdras Esdras B and A respectively. This usage is noted by the early Christian scholar Origen, who remarked that the Hebrew 'book of Ezra' might then be considered a 'double' book.

Jerome, writing in the early 5th century, noted that this duplication had since been adopted by Greek and Latin Christians. Jerome himself rejected the duplication in his Vulgate translation of the Bible into Latin from the Hebrew. Consequently, all early Vulgate manuscripts present Ezra-Nehemiah as a single book.

From the 9th century onwards, Latin bibles are found that for the first time separate the Ezra and Nehemiah sections of Ezra-Nehemiah as two distinct books, then called the first and second books of Ezra. This becomes standard in the Paris Bibles of the 13th century. It was not until 1516/17, in the first printed Rabbinic Bible of Daniel Bomberg that the separation was introduced generally in Hebrew Bibles.

=== First Esdras ===
1 Esdras, also known as "Esdras α", is an alternate Greek-language version of Ezra. This text has one additional section, the 'Tale of the Three Guardsmen' in the middle of Ezra 4. 1 Esdras (3 Esdras in the Vulgate) was considered apocryphal by Jerome.

== Date, structure and composition ==
=== Date ===
Koresh of Ezra 1:1 is called "king of Persia" (מלך פרס Melekh Pāras); the title was introduced by Cyrus the Great sometime after he defeated Astyages of Media (585–550 BC).

Scholars are divided over the chronological sequence of the activities of Ezra and Nehemiah. Ezra 7:8 says that Ezra arrived in Jerusalem in the seventh year of King Artaxerxes, while Nehemiah 2:1–9 has Nehemiah arriving in Artaxerxes' twentieth year. If this was Artaxerxes I (465–424 BC), then Ezra arrived in 458 and Nehemiah in 445 BC. Nehemiah 8–9, in which the two (possibly by editorial error) appear together, supports this scenario.

=== Structure ===
The contents of Ezra–Nehemiah are structured in a theological rather than chronological order: "The Temple must come first, then the purifying of the community, then the building of the outer walls of the city, and so finally all could reach a grand climax in the reading of the law."

The narrative follows a repeating pattern in which the God of Israel "stirs up" the king of Persia to commission a Jewish leader (Zerubbabel, Ezra, Nehemiah) to undertake a mission; the leader completes his mission in the face of opposition, and success is marked by a great assembly. The tasks of the three leaders are progressive: first the Temple is restored (Zerubabbel), then the community of Israel (Ezra), and finally the walls which will separate the purified community and Temple from the outside world (Nehemiah).

The pattern is completed with a final coda in which Nehemiah restores belief in Yahweh. This concern with a schematic pattern-making, rather than with history in the modern sense of a factual account of events in the order in which they occurred, explains the origin of the many problems which surround both Ezra and Nehemiah as historical sources.

=== Composition ===
Twentieth-century views on the composition of Ezra revolved around whether the author was Ezra himself, and who may have also authored the Books of Chronicles, or was another author or authors who also wrote the Chronicles. More recently it has been increasingly recognised that Ezra, Nehemiah and Chronicles all have extremely complex histories stretching over many stages of editing, and most scholars now are cautious of assuming a unified composition with a single theology and point of view. As an indication of the many layers of editing which Ezra has undergone, one recent study finds that Ezra 1–6 and Ezra 9–10 were originally separate documents, that they were spliced together at a later stage by the authors of Ezra 7–8, and that all have undergone extensive later editing.

Tamara Cohn Eskenazi argues that the final composition of Ezra took place during the late Persian period (c. 370–350 BCE), with some small additions from the Hellenistic period. She states that the language and ideology of the book seem to best fit within a Persian-period context.

== Manuscripts ==
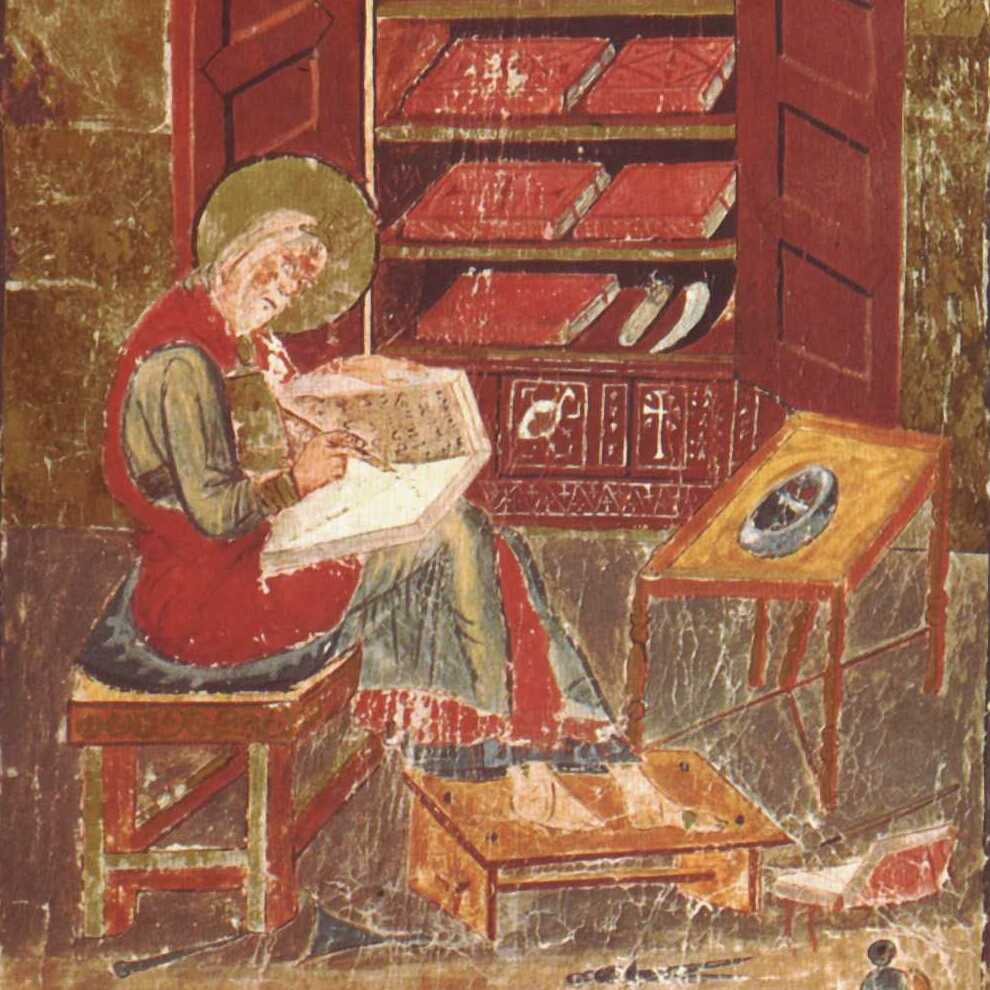
Ezra at work in the Codex Amiatinus (AD 716 or earlier)

The oldest surviving manuscript of Ezra is 4QEzra, also called 4Q117; it contains Ezra 4:2–6, 9–11; 5:17; 6:1–5. It dates to the Hasmonean period (140–37 BC). A 7th-century Egyptian ostracon contains a fragmentary text of the Septuagint (Greek translation): 1 Esdras 2:10, 9:21–24. A Vulgar Latin translation is found in the Codex Amiatinus (8th century). The Hebrew text in full is found in the Aleppo Codex (10th century) and Leningrad Codex (11th century).

== Persian documents ==
Seven purported Persian decrees of kings or letters to and from high officials are quoted in Ezra. Their authenticity has been contentious. While some scholars accept them in their current form, most accept only part of them as genuine, while still others reject them entirely. L.L. Grabbe surveyed six tests against which the documents can be measured (comparative known Persian material, linguistic details, contents, presence of Jewish theology, the Persian attitude to local religions, and Persian letter-writing formulas) and concluded that all the documents are late post-Persian works and probable forgeries, but that some features suggest a genuine Persian correspondence behind some of them. Other scholars, such as Richard C. Steiner and H. G. M. Williamson, argue that the linguistic and other evidence suggests that the documents are authentic.

== See also ==
- Esdras
- Ezra-Nama
- Ezra-Nehemiah

Book of Ezra History books
Preceded by Daniel	Hebrew Bible	Succeeded by Nehemiah
Preceded by 1–2 Chronicles	Western; Old Testament	Succeeded by Nehemiah
Preceded by 1 Esdras	Eastern; Old Testament	Succeeded by Nehemiah
