= Harran Stela =

Babylonian stela ~540BC

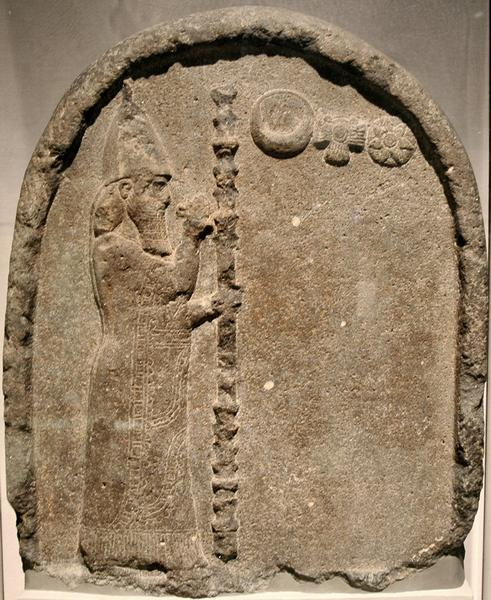
- Nabonidus, last Neo-Babylonian king, shown worshipping the Sun, Ishtar (Venus), and the moon-god Sin
- Created: c. 541 BC
- Discovered: 1956; Harran, Sanlıurfa, Turkey

The Harran Stela (not to be confused with the Harran inscription) was discovered in 1956 in the ruins of Harran, in what is now southeast Turkey. It consists of two parts, both of which show, at the top, Nabonidus worshipping symbols of the Sun, Ishtar, and the moon-god Sin. The Stela was likely composed between 542–540 BC.

The stela is significant as a text that demonstrates the adoration of Nabonidus to the Sun, Ishtar, and especially Sin, departing from traditional Babylonian exaltation of the chief god Marduk.

== Text ==
The following translation is that of C. J. Gadd.

(This is) the great miracle of Sin that none of the (other) gods and goddesses knew (how to achieve), that has not happened in the country from the days of old, that the people of the country have (not) observed nor written down on clay tables to be preserved for eternity, that (you), Sin, the lord of all the gods and goddesses residing in heaven, have come down from heaven to (me) Nabonidus, king of Babylon! For me, Nabonidus, the lonely one who has nobody, in whose (text: my) heart was not thought of kingship, the gods and goddesses prayed (to Sin) and called me to kingship. At midnight, he (Sin) made me have a dream and said (in the dream) as follows: “Rebuild speedily Ehulhul, the temple of Sin in Harran, and I will hand over to you all the countries. Upon the command of Sin <<and>> Ishtar, the Lady-of-Battle, without whom neither hostilities nor reconciliation can occur in the country and no battle can be fought, extended her protection (lit.: hand) over them, and the king of Egypt, the Medes and the land of the Arabs, all the hostile kings, were sending me messages of reconciliation and friendship. As to the land of the Arabs which [is the eternal enemy] of Babylonia [and which] was (always) ready to rob and carry off its possession, Nergal broke their weapons upon the order of Sin, and they all bowed down at my feet.

== Description and interpretation ==
The first quote shows Nabonidus's devotion to Sin, and also shows that Nabonidus was “one who has nobody,” i.e. he was not of any royal house, and yet he became king. Other sources relate that he was a co-conspirator in the coup that executed Labashi-Marduk, after which his co-conspirators elected him as king.

The second section relates to the third year of Nabonidus' reign when he left Babylon to help commission the reconstruction of the Ehulhul temple to Sin in Harran, and apparently also to fight the hostile Arabs in the area. At that time, he installed his oldest son Belshazzar as regent in Babylon. During the time in Tayma, the Stela describes Nabonidus’s interactions with the enemies of Babylonia.
