= Edict of Cyrus =

Proclamation by Cyrus II of Persia in 539 BCE

The Edict of Cyrus usually refers to the biblical account of a proclamation by Cyrus the Great, the founding king of the Achaemenid Persian Empire, in 539 BC. It was issued after the Persians conquered the Neo-Babylonian Empire upon the fall of Babylon, and is described in the Tanakh, which claims that it authorized and encouraged the return to Zion and the rebuilding of the Temple in Jerusalem (i.e., the Second Temple).

The Cyrus Cylinder text has also been called the "Edict of Cyrus", but this text is now considered to support the biblical account only in a very general sense.

== Biblical narrative ==
The edict of Cyrus appears in chapter 36 of the Second Book of Chronicles in the Hebrew Bible:

Now in the first year of Cyrus king of Persia, that the word of the LORD by the mouth of Jeremiah might be accomplished, the LORD stirred up the spirit of Cyrus king of Persia, that he made a proclamation throughout all his kingdom, and put it also in writing, saying: 'Thus saith Cyrus king of Persia: All the kingdoms of the earth hath the LORD, the God of heaven, given me; and He hath charged me to build Him a house in Jerusalem, which is in Judah. Whosoever there is among you of all His people—the LORD his God be with him—let him go up.'

— 2 Chronicles 36:22–23

Ezra 1:1–4 reads:

Now in the first year of Cyrus king of Persia, that the word of the LORD by the mouth of Jeremiah might be accomplished, the LORD stirred up the spirit of Cyrus king of Persia, that he made a proclamation throughout all his kingdom, and put it also in writing, saying: 'Thus saith Cyrus king of Persia: All the kingdoms of the earth hath the LORD, the God of heaven, given me; and He hath charged me to build Him a house in Jerusalem, which is in Judah. Whosoever there is among you of all His people—his God be with him—let him go up to Jerusalem, which is in Judah, and build the house of the LORD, the God of Israel, He is the God who is in Jerusalem. And whosoever is left, in any place where he sojourneth, let the men of his place help him with silver, and with gold, and with goods, and with beasts, beside the freewill-offering for the house of God which is in Jerusalem.'

— Ezra 1:1–4

1 Esdras 2:1-7 reads:

In the first year of Cyrus king of the Persians, that the word of the Lord might be accomplished, that he had promised by the mouth of Jeremy; The Lord raised up the spirit of Cyrus the king of the Persians, and he made proclamation through all his kingdom, and also by writing, Saying, Thus saith Cyrus king of the Persians; The Lord of Israel, the most high Lord, hath made me king of the whole world, And commanded me to build him an house at Jerusalem in Jewry. If therefore there be any of you that are of his people, let the Lord, even his Lord, be with him, and let him go up to Jerusalem that is in Judea, and build the house of the Lord of Israel: for he is the Lord that dwelleth in Jerusalem. Whosoever then dwell in the places about, let them help him, those, I say, that are his neighbours, with gold, and with silver, With gifts, with horses, and with cattle, and other things, which have been set forth by vow, for the temple of the Lord at Jerusalem.

— 1 Esdras 2:1–7

The Book of Ezra says that the people of Cutha, known in Hebrew as "Cuthim" and described as the "adversaries" of the returning exiles, requested to join in the construction of the Second Temple, and when rebuffed by Zerubbabel and his companions, they composed a letter of complaint to Artaxerxes of Persia:

And in the reign of Ahasuerus, in the beginning of his reign, wrote they an accusation against the inhabitants of Judah and Jerusalem. And in the days of Artaxerxes wrote Bishlam, Mithredath, Tabeel, and the rest of his companions, unto Artaxerxes king of Persia; and the writing of the letter was written in the Aramaic character, and set forth in the Aramaic tongue. Rehum the commander and Shimshai the scribe wrote a letter against Jerusalem to Artaxerxes the king in this sort—then wrote Rehum the commander, and Shimshai the scribe, and the rest of their companions; the Dinites, and the Apharesattechites, the Tarpelites, the Apharesites, the Archevites, the Babylonians, the Shushanchites, the Dehites, the Elamites, and the rest of the nations whom the great and noble Asenappar brought over, and set in the city of Samaria, and the rest that are in the country beyond the River:—'And now—this is the copy of the letter that they sent unto him, even unto Artaxerxes the king—thy servants the men beyond the River—and now be it known unto the king, that the Jews that came up from thee are come to us unto Jerusalem; they are building the rebellious and the bad city, and have finished the walls, and are digging out the foundations. Be it known now unto the king, that, if this city be builded, and the walls finished, they will not pay tribute, impost, or toll, and so thou wilt endamage the revenue of the kings. Now because we eat the salt of the palace, and it is not meet for us to see the king's dishonour, therefore have we sent and announced to the king, that search may be made in the book of the records of thy fathers; so shalt thou find in the book of the records, and know that this city is a rebellious city, and hurtful unto kings and provinces, and that they have moved sedition within the same of old time; for which cause was this city laid waste. We announce to the king that, if this city be builded, and the walls finished, by this means thou shalt have no portion beyond the River.' Then sent the king an answer unto Rehum the commander, and to Shimshai the scribe, and to the rest of their companions that dwell in Samaria, and unto the rest beyond the River: 'Peace, and now the letter which ye sent unto us hath been plainly read before me. And I decreed, and search hath been made, and it is found that this city of old time hath made insurrection against kings, and that rebellion and sedition have been made therein. There have been mighty kings also over Jerusalem, who have ruled over all the country beyond the River; and tribute, impost, and toll, was paid unto them. Make ye now a decree to cause these men to cease, and that this city be not builded, until a decree shall be made by me. And take heed that ye be not slack herein; why should damage grow to the hurt of the kings?' Then when the copy of king Artaxerxes' letter was read before Rehum, and Shimshai the scribe, and their companions, they went in haste to Jerusalem unto the Jews, and made them to cease by force and power. Then ceased the work of the house of God which is at Jerusalem; and it ceased unto the second year of the reign of Darius king of Persia.

— Ezra 4:6–24

Rabbi Meïr Weiser advanced the theory that the party of Mithredath Tabeel took advantage of the translation protocol contained in the document issued by Cyrus the Great's government. Essentially the protocol stated that each country in his kingdom was entitled to speak their unique language and pen texts to the king in their native tongue and have the presiding local officers of Artaxerxes of Persia translate the document. Weiser continued that Mithredath Tabeel presented a substantial bribe to Rehum the secretary and Shimshai the scribe to have them compose a letter containing an ambiguity that could be interpreted as saying that the post-exile temple builders have varied the king's edict by actively engaging in the construction and fortification of the walls of Jerusalem in an attempt to rebel against the foreign king's rule. The ploy of Mithredath Tabeel and company was successful in leading to a 14-year cessation of all temple building activity in Jerusalem.

Following a second letter sent by the Persian governor asking the king for a decision, the Edict is found in the archives and the king gives his orders accordingly:

Then Darius the king made a decree, and search was made in the house of the archives, where the treasures were laid up, in Babylon. And there was found at Ahmetha, in the palace that is in the province of Media, a roll, and therein was thus written: 'A record. In the first year of Cyrus the king, Cyrus the king made a decree: Concerning the house of God at Jerusalem, let the house be builded, the place where they offer sacrifices, and let the foundations thereof be strongly laid; the height thereof threescore cubits, and the breadth thereof threescore cubits; with three rows of great stones, and a row of new timber, and let the expenses be given out of the king's house; and also let the gold and silver vessels of the house of God, which Nebuchadnezzar took forth out of the temple which is at Jerusalem, and brought unto Babylon, be restored, and brought back unto the temple which is at Jerusalem, every one to its place, and thou shalt put them in the house of God.' 'Now therefore, Tattenai, governor beyond the River, Shethar-bozenai, and your companions the Apharesachites, who are beyond the River, be ye far from thence; let the work of this house of God alone; let the governor of the Jews and the elders of the Jews build this house of God in its place. Moreover I make a decree concerning what ye shall do to these elders of the Jews for the building of this house of God; that of the king's goods, even of the tribute beyond the River, expenses be given with all diligence unto these men, that they be not hindered. And that which they have need of, both young bullocks, and rams, and lambs, for burnt-offerings to the God of heaven, wheat, salt, wine, and oil, according to the word of the priests that are at Jerusalem, let it be given them day by day without fail; that they may offer sacrifices of sweet savour unto the God of heaven, and pray for the life of the king, and of his sons. Also I have made a decree, that whosoever shall alter this word, let a beam be pulled out from his house, and let him be lifted up and fastened thereon; and let his house be made a dunghill for this; and may the God that hath caused His name to dwell there overthrow all kings and peoples, that shall put forth their hand to alter the same, to destroy this house of God which is at Jerusalem. I Darius have made a decree; let it be done with all diligence.'

— Ezra 6:1–12

== Historicity ==
The Cyrus Cylinder, an ancient clay cylinder inscribed with a declaration in the name of Cyrus referring to restoration of temples and repatriation of exiled peoples, has been taken by many scholars as corroboration of the authenticity of the biblical decrees attributed to Cyrus. Other scholars view the cylinder's text as specific to Babylon and Mesopotamia and highlight the absence of any mention of Judah or Jerusalem. Professor Lester L. Grabbe, while acknowledging a "general policy of allowing deportees to return and to re-establish cult sites", asserts that the "alleged decree of Cyrus permitting—even commanding—the Jews to rebuild the temple...cannot be considered authentic". He also characterizes the relevant archaeology as suggesting that the return was a "trickle" occurring over decades, rather than a single event. This view is supported by the prophet Haggai who states that the temple was not rebuilt by the "second year of King Darius", as the second year of Darius reign would have been approximately 20 years after Cyrus original decree.
