= Zechariah 2 =

Bible chapter

- ← chapter 1 chapter 3 →
- A facsimile edition of the book of Twelve Minor Prophets in the Leningrad Codex (1008 CE) including Zechariah, and the masoretic information for the end of Nevi'im.
- Book: Book of Zechariah
- Category: Nevi'im
- Christian Bible part: Old Testament
- Order in the Christian part: 38

Zechariah 2 is the second of the 14 chapters in the Book of Zechariah in the Hebrew Bible or the Old Testament of the Christian Bible. This book contains the prophecies attributed to the prophet Zechariah. In the Hebrew Bible it forms part of the Book of the Twelve Minor Prophets. This chapter is a part of a section (so-called "First Zechariah") consisting of Zechariah 1–8. It records the third of eight visions received by the prophet (verses 1–5), followed by an oracle calling the exiles to return to the city where Yahweh is about to dwell and all nations will come (verses 6–13).

== Text ==
The original text was written in the Hebrew language. This chapter is divided into 13 verses in English Bibles. The Hebrew Bible uses different "verse numbering" (see below).

=== Verse numbering ===
There are some differences in verse numbering of this chapter in English Bibles and Hebrew texts:

| English | Hebrew |
|---|---|
| 1:18-21 | 2:1-4 |
| 2:1-13 | 2:5-17 |

This article generally follows the common numbering in Christian English Bible versions, with notes to the numbering in Hebrew Bible versions.

=== Textual witnesses ===
Some early manuscripts containing the text of this chapter in Hebrew are of the Masoretic Text, which includes the Codex Cairensis (from year 895), the Petersburg Codex of the Prophets (916), and Codex Leningradensis (1008). (Note: The Aleppo Codex (930) now only contains Zechariah 9:17b–14:21.)

Fragments containing parts of this chapter were found among the Dead Sea Scrolls, that is, 4Q80 (4QXII^{e}; 75–50 BCE) with extant verses 6–10 (verses 10–14 in Masoretic verse numbering).

There is also a translation into Koine Greek known as the Septuagint, made in the last few centuries BCE. Extant ancient manuscripts of the Septuagint version include Codex Vaticanus (B; $\mathfrak{G}$^{B}; 4th century), Codex Sinaiticus (S; BHK: $\mathfrak{G}$^{S}; 4th century), Codex Alexandrinus (A; $\mathfrak{G}$^{A}; 5th century) and Codex Marchalianus (Q; $\mathfrak{G}$^{Q}; 6th century). Some fragments containing parts of this chapter (a revision of the Septuagint) were found among the Dead Sea Scrolls, i.e., Naḥal Ḥever 8Ḥev1 (8ḤevXII^{gr}); late 1st century BCE) with extant verses 3-5, 7-8, 12-13 (verses 7–9, 11–12, 16–17 in Masoretic verse numbering).

== Vision of the measuring line (2:1–5; Hebrew 2:5–9) ==
This section records the third of Zechariah's eight visions, in which he saw a man with a measuring line travelling to Jerusalem to measure the city's length and width. The vision points to the unlimited size of the restored city (cf. Isaiah 49:19–21), assuring the people that God's glory will be in there (cf. Ezekiel 43:1–5; Haggai 2:9). Jerusalem will become "a city without walls". Katrina Larkin notes that "the formerly negative image of a city without walls becomes a positive one". God will protect the people as in the past (Exodus 13:21).

== Future joy of Zion and many nations (2:6–13; Hebrew 2:10–17) ==
The oracle in this section, added onto the third vision, urges the exiles who are still in Babylon to return to Zion, for God will dwell in that city Jerusalem, and other nations will come.

=== Verse 6 ===
Up! Up! Flee from the land of the north, declares the Lord. For I have spread you abroad as the four winds of the heavens, declares the Lord.

The "land of the north" refers to Babylon, and, more broadly, to the whole Babylonian empire. The King James Version's distinctive wording reads "Ho, ho, come forth, and flee from the land of the north."

=== Verse 10 ===
Sing and rejoice, O daughter of Zion:

for, lo, I come, and I will dwell in the midst of thee,

saith the Lord.

- "Lo, I come": Septuagint: ἰδοὺ ἐγὼ ἔρχομαι; in the Gospel of Matthew, Jesus Christ is called ὁ ἐρχόμενος, "he who comes" (Matthew 11:3).
- "Dwell in the midst of thee" is alluded to in the Gospel of John: "The Word was made Flesh and dwelt among us" (John 1:14) and in the Book of Revelation: "Behold the tabernacle of God is with men, and He will dwell with them, and they shall be His people, and God Himself shall be with them and shall be their God" (Revelation 21:3). Thus, it refers primarily at Messiah's first advent (Psalm 40:7; John 1:14; Colossians 2:9; 1 Timothy 3:16); yet more fully at the second advent (Isaiah 40:10; cf. Zechariah 9:9, Isaiah 12:6; Ezekiel 37:27; Zephaniah 3:14). God dwells spiritually in his people (2 Corinthians 6:16), alluding to the constant presence of Jesus Christ in his churches.

=== Verse 11 ===
And many nations shall be joined to the Lord in that day,

and shall be my people:

and I will dwell in the midst of thee,

and thou shalt know that the Lord of hosts hath sent me unto thee.

- "Many nations shall be joined to the Lord": ("shall be joined" = "shall join themselves"); "shall fly for refuge unto the Lord" (Septuagint); "cleaving to Him by a close union". Isaiah speaks about 'single proselytes' in Isaiah 56:3–6, whereas Jeremiah uses 'the word of Israel's self-exhortation' when they return from Babylon, that "going and weeping," they shall go and seek the Lord their God, saying, "Come and let us join ourselves unto the Lord, in a perpetual covenant that shall not be forgotten" (Jeremiah 50:4–5).
- "My people": or "unto me for a people"; Septuagint: "shall be unto him for a people" (cf. Zechariah 8:20). Many nations who will become "the Lord's people" share that title with people of Israel (cf. Isaiah 2:2, 3; Isaiah 11:10; Micah 4:2; Zephaniah 2:11),
- "Sent me unto thee": an addition of "unto thee" to the same formula (Zechariah 2:9). Here YHWH first says, "I will dwell", then says that YHWH "sent", thus, 'YHWH the Sender and YHWH the Sent must be One'.

== See also ==
- Darius I
- Judah
- Jerusalem
- Related Bible parts: Isaiah 2, Isaiah 11, Micah 4, Zephaniah 2, Haggai 1, Haggai 2, Zechariah 1, Zechariah 3, Zechariah 4, Zechariah 5, Zechariah 6, John 1, Revelation 21

== Sources ==
- Boda, Mark J. (2016). Harrison, R. K.; Hubbard, Jr, Robert L. (eds.). The Book of Zechariah. New International Commentary on the Old Testament. Wm. B. Eerdmans Publishing. ISBN 978-0802823755.
- Collins, John J. (2014). Introduction to the Hebrew Scriptures. Fortress Press. ISBN 9781451469233.
- Coogan, Michael David (2007). Coogan, Michael David; Brettler, Marc Zvi; Newsom, Carol Ann; Perkins, Pheme (eds.). The New Oxford Annotated Bible with the Apocryphal/Deuterocanonical Books: New Revised Standard Version, Issue 48 (Augmented 3rd ed.). Oxford University Press. ISBN 9780195288810.
- Fitzmyer, Joseph A. (2008). A Guide to the Dead Sea Scrolls and Related Literature. Grand Rapids, MI: William B. Eerdmans Publishing Company. ISBN 9780802862419.
- Hayes, Christine (2015). Introduction to the Bible. Yale University Press. ISBN 978-0300188271.
- Larkin, Katrina J. A. (2007). "37. Zechariah". In Barton, John; Muddiman, John (eds.). The Oxford Bible Commentary (first (paperback) ed.). Oxford University Press. pp. 610–615. ISBN 978-0199277186.
- Mason, Rex (1993). "Zechariah, The Book of.". In Metzger, Bruce M; Coogan, Michael D (eds.). The Oxford Companion to the Bible. Oxford University Press. ISBN 978-0195046458.
- Ulrich, Eugene, ed. (2010). The Biblical Qumran Scrolls: Transcriptions and Textual Variants. Brill.
- Würthwein, Ernst (1995). The Text of the Old Testament. Translated by Rhodes, Erroll F. Grand Rapids, MI: Wm. B. Eerdmans. ISBN 0-8028-0788-7.
