= Zechariah 6 =

Bible chapter

- ← chapter 5 chapter 7 →
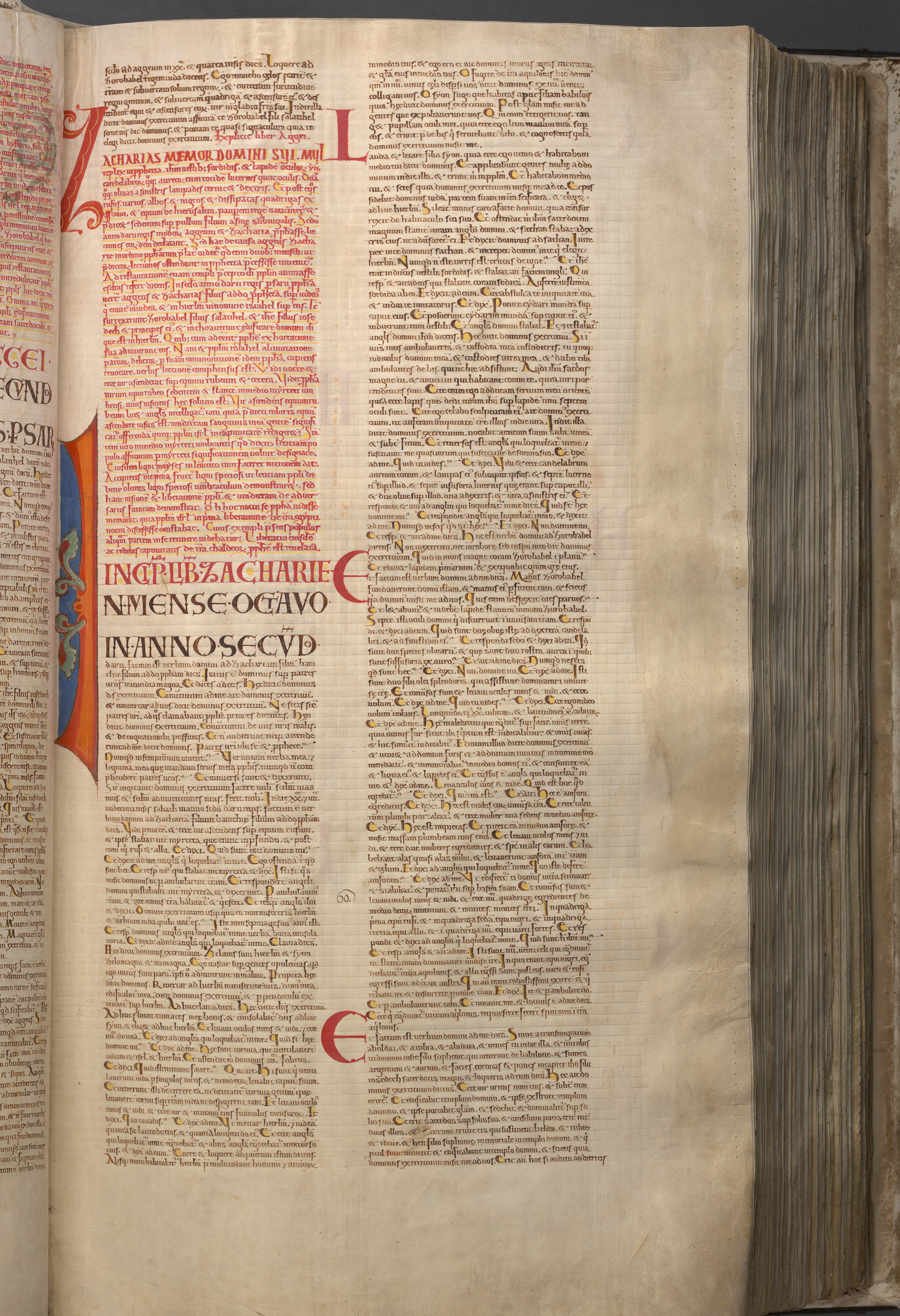
- The beginning part of the Book of Zechariah (1:1-6:15) in Latin in Codex Gigas, made around 13th century.
- Book: Book of Zechariah
- Category: Nevi'im
- Christian Bible part: Old Testament
- Order in the Christian part: 38

Zechariah 6 is the sixth of the 14 chapters in the Book of Zechariah in the Hebrew Bible or the Old Testament of the Christian Bible. This book contains the prophecies attributed to the prophet Zechariah. In the Hebrew Bible it is part of the Book of the Twelve Minor Prophets. This chapter contains a description of Zechariah's eighth and final vision, and the crowning of Joshua the High Priest. It is a part of a section (so-called "First Zechariah") consisting of Zechariah 1–8.

== Text ==
The original text was written in the Hebrew language. This chapter is divided into 15 verses.

=== Textual witnesses ===
Some early manuscripts containing the text of this chapter in Hebrew are of the Masoretic Text, which includes the Codex Cairensis (from year 895), the Petersburg Codex of the Prophets (916), and Codex Leningradensis (1008). (Note: The Aleppo Codex (930) now only contains Zechariah 9:17b–14:21.) Fragments containing parts of this chapter were found among the Dead Sea Scrolls, that is, 4Q80 (4QXII^{e}; 75–50 BCE) with extant verses 1–5.

There is also a translation into Koine Greek known as the Septuagint, made in the last few centuries BCE. Extant ancient manuscripts of the Septuagint version include Codex Vaticanus (B; $\mathfrak{G}$^{B}; 4th century), Codex Sinaiticus (S; BHK: $\mathfrak{G}$^{S}; 4th century), Codex Alexandrinus (A; $\mathfrak{G}$^{A}; 5th century) and Codex Marchalianus (Q; $\mathfrak{G}$^{Q}; 6th century).

== Vision of the four chariots (verses 1–8) ==
This section records the eighth (and final) vision in the series, (Note: Some writers, such as the German commentators Carl Friedrich Keil and Franz Delitzsch, hold that the sixth and the seventh visions are parts of a single vision, and therefore they only enumerate seven visions in all.) which forms an inclusio with the first, referring to the pacifying of "the north country". This is the direction from which the majority of attacks on Israel had come (cf. references to the threat from the north in Jeremiah 1:14).

=== Verse 5 ===
And the angel answered and said to me, “These are four spirits of heaven, who go out from their station before the Lord of all the earth."

- "Spirits of heaven": or "winds of heaven" (MEV). The Hebrew word for "spirit" may also mean "wind" or "breath", depending on the context (cf. ASV, NRSV, CEV "the four winds of heaven").

== The command to crown Joshua (verses 9–15) ==
Following the final vision, the remaining verses in this chapter close the "vision cycle" by describing the crowning of Joshua the High Priest as a 'messianic' leader. Zerubbabel, the governor and temple-builder, and Joshua are referred to together in the prophecies of Zechariah's contemporary Haggai, and both have been the subject of earlier references in Zechariah. Larkin suggests that Zerubbabel would have been included here originally and his name has been "blatantly" removed during the evolution of the text, leaving only the name of Joshua. The editors of the Jerusalem Bible argue that Joshua's name replaced that of Zerubbabel in the original text once the high priests had become the leaders of the Jewish community: see High Priest of Israel#Late Second Temple.

=== Verse 10 ===
Take from the exiles Heldai, Tobijah, and Jedaiah, who have arrived from Babylon, and go the same day to the house of Josiah, the son of Zephaniah.

The prophet is to take "an offering" from these returning exiles. Some translations refer to Heldai as "Helem" in verse 14.

=== Verse 11 ===
Then take silver and gold, and make crowns,

and set them upon the head of Joshua the son of Josedech, the high priest;

- "Silver and gold": A part of what was brought from Babylon or the contributions from the Jews in the diaspora, the kings and princes in the area (see Ezra 6:8, etc.; Ezra 7:15, etc.).
- "Make crowns": Zechariah was to get the crowns made (compare Exodus 25, passim). The plural may here be used intensively for "a noble crown", as in Job 31:36 (also in Job 19:9, Proverbs 4:9; Proverbs 12:4; Proverbs 14:24; Proverbs 16:31. Proverbs 17:6); or it may signify the two metals of which the crown was made, two or more wreaths being intertwined to form it. Here Joshua may symbolize 'a Person in whom the offices of priest and king were united' (cf. Psalm 110; in Revelation 19:12 Jesus (= "Joshua" in Hebrew) is said to wear many crowns on his head, referring to 'a diadem composed of many circlets'), because a high priest's "mitre" (Zechariah 3:5; made of the plate or "flower" of pure gold with the engraving "Holiness to the Lord" Exodus 28:36) is never called a crown, but what to be set on Joshua's head is a royal crown.

=== Verse 12 ===
And speak unto him, saying, Thus speaketh the Lord of hosts, saying,

Behold the man whose name is The Branch;

and he shall grow up out of his place,
and he shall build the temple of the Lord:

- "Behold, the man" (Hebrew: הנה איש, hi-nêh ’îš): This phrase is used in a speech to draw attention to someone different from the one in conversation (1 Samuel 9:6, 17; 2 Samuel 18:26; cf. Joshua 2:2), so Joshua here is not the Branch (the Sprout figure), but that figure is 'accessible and approaching' the scene. Pilate spoke similar words regarding Jesus, "Behold the man" (John 19:5).
- "Grow up out": from the Hebrew verb צָמַח, tsa-makh, to "sprout out", with the same root as for the noun צֶ֤מַח, tse-makh, a "sprout", translated here as "The Branch" (Zechariah 3:8; Isaiah 4:2; Isaiah 11:1; Jeremiah 23:5; Jeremiah 33:15); referring to a lowly figure growing in obscurity "as a tender plant and a root out of a dry ground" (Isaiah 53:2; cf. Exodus 10:23).
- "He shall build the temple of the Lord": In the time of Zechariah, the temple was soon to be finished by Zerubbabel, to whom this had been promised (Zechariah 4:10), not by Joshua the High Priest, but then a new temple is to be built from the foundation, of which the builder is to be "the foundation" (Isaiah 28:16; 1 Corinthians 3:11; Ephesians 2:20–21), as said, "on this rock I will build My Church" (Matthew 16:18); and in him "all the building, fitly framed together0, groweth unto an holy temple to the Lord" (Ephesians 2:21).

== See also ==
- Four Horsemen of the Apocalypse
- Joshua the High Priest
- Related Bible parts: Isaiah 4, Isaiah 11, Isaiah 54, Jeremiah 23, Jeremiah 33, Haggai 1, Zechariah 1, Zechariah 2, Zechariah 3, Zechariah 4, Zechariah 5, Revelation 6

== Sources ==
- Boda, Mark J. (2016). Harrison, R. K.; Hubbard, Jr, Robert L. (eds.). The Book of Zechariah. New International Commentary on the Old Testament. Wm. B. Eerdmans Publishing. ISBN 978-0802823755.
- Collins, John J. (2014). Introduction to the Hebrew Scriptures. Fortress Press. ISBN 9781451469233.
- Coogan, Michael David (2007). Coogan, Michael David; Brettler, Marc Zvi; Newsom, Carol Ann; Perkins, Pheme (eds.). The New Oxford Annotated Bible with the Apocryphal/Deuterocanonical Books: New Revised Standard Version, Issue 48 (Augmented 3rd ed.). Oxford University Press. ISBN 9780195288810.
- Fitzmyer, Joseph A. (2008). A Guide to the Dead Sea Scrolls and Related Literature. Grand Rapids, MI: William B. Eerdmans Publishing Company. ISBN 9780802862419.
- Hayes, Christine (2015). Introduction to the Bible. Yale University Press. ISBN 978-0300188271.
- Larkin, Katrina J. A. (2007). "37. Zechariah". In Barton, John; Muddiman, John (eds.). The Oxford Bible Commentary (first (paperback) ed.). Oxford University Press. pp. 610–615. ISBN 978-0199277186.
- Mason, Rex (1993). "Zechariah, The Book of.". In Metzger, Bruce M; Coogan, Michael D (eds.). The Oxford Companion to the Bible. Oxford University Press. ISBN 978-0195046458.
- Ulrich, Eugene, ed. (2010). The Biblical Qumran Scrolls: Transcriptions and Textual Variants. Brill.
- Würthwein, Ernst (1995). The Text of the Old Testament. Translated by Rhodes, Erroll F. Grand Rapids, MI: Wm. B. Eerdmans. ISBN 0-8028-0788-7.
