= Zechariah 3 =

Chapter in the Hebrew Bible

- ← chapter 2 chapter 4 →
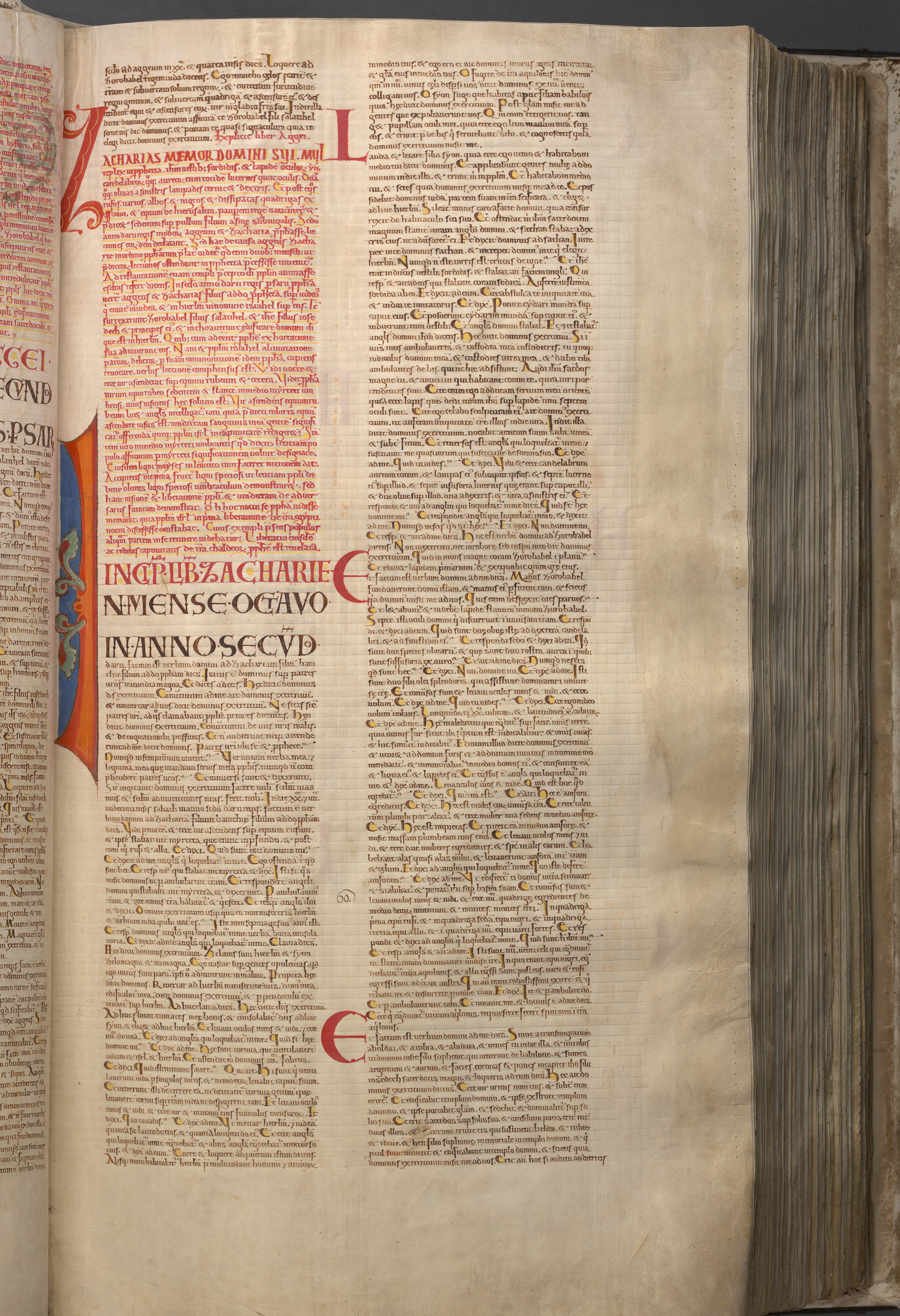
- The beginning part of the Book of Zechariah (1:1-6:15) in Latin in Codex Gigas, made around 13th century.
- Book: Book of Zechariah
- Category: Nevi'im
- Christian Bible part: Old Testament
- Order in the Christian part: 38

Zechariah 3 is the third of the 14 chapters in the Book of Zechariah in the Hebrew Bible or the Old Testament of the Christian Bible. This book contains the prophecies attributed to the prophet Zechariah. In the Hebrew Bible it forms part of the Book of the Twelve Minor Prophets. This chapter records a vision of Joshua, the high priest, being cleansed before God. It is a part of a section (so-called "First Zechariah") consisting of Zechariah 1–8.

== Text ==
The original text was written in the Hebrew language. This chapter is divided into 10 verses.

=== Textual witnesses ===
Some early manuscripts containing the text of this chapter in Hebrew are of the Masoretic Text, which includes the Codex Cairensis (from year 895), the Petersburg Codex of the Prophets (916), and Codex Leningradensis (1008). (Note: The Aleppo Codex (930) now only contains Zechariah 9:17b–14:21.)

Fragments containing parts of this chapter were found among the Dead Sea Scrolls, that is, 4Q80 (4QXII^{e}; 75–50 BCE) with extant verses 2–10.

There is also a translation into Koine Greek known as the Septuagint, made in the last few centuries BCE. Extant ancient manuscripts of the Septuagint version include Codex Vaticanus (B; $\mathfrak{G}$^{B}; 4th century), Codex Sinaiticus (S; BHK: $\mathfrak{G}$^{S}; 4th century), Codex Alexandrinus (A; $\mathfrak{G}$^{A}; 5th century) and Codex Marchalianus (Q; $\mathfrak{G}$^{Q}; 6th century). Some fragments containing parts of this chapter (a revision of the Septuagint) were found among the Dead Sea Scrolls, that is, Naḥal Ḥever 8Ḥev1 (8ḤevXII^{gr}); late 1st century BCE) with extant verses 1–7.

== Commentary ==
The fourth of Zechariah's eight visions revealed Joshua, the high priest of Israel ("Jeshua" in Ezra–Nehemiah), who was accused by Satan ("the Adversary", acting as the prosecuting counsel in the heavenly court) but acquitted. His subsequent "cleansing" gives the sign that God will forgive and cleanse the community, signified by the renewal of the temple services.

=== Vision of the High Priest (verses 1–5) ===
The prophet sees a real person, the high priest Joshua, unlike the symbolic objects seen in other visions. He is wearing dirty clothing, possibly referring to the clothes worn in mourning.

The replacement of Joshua's "filthy clothes" (verses 3–4) with new apparel gives the legitimation of the new temple and priesthood. The new clothes are "festal apparel", and a clean priestly turban.

=== The Coming Branch (3:6–10) ===
The resumption of the temple worship will lead to the coming of "the Branch" (verse 8), who will restore the kingship into a new era (verse 10), when the iniquity of the land will be cleansed in one day (verse 9).

==== Verse 8 ====
Hear now, O Joshua the high priest,

thou, and thy fellows that sit before thee:

for they are men wondered at:

for, behold, I will bring forth my servant the Branch.

- "Thy fellows": The priests, who sat with the high priest in council (cf. 2 Kings 4:38; Ezekiel 8:1, etc.), were not seen in the vision.
- "Men wondered at": Septuagint: διότι ἄνδρες τερατοσκόποι εἰσί, "men observers of wonders;" Vulgate: Quia viri portendentes sunt (cf. Isaiah 8:18); can be rendered, "men of portent, sign, or type," that the Revised Version has, "men which are a sign," those who foreshadow some future events, for good things to come; NKJV: "they are a wondrous sign", lit. "men of a sign or wonder".
- "My servants the Branch": The double significance to the messianic meaning of the passage is emphasized by the collocation of the two keywords "servant" and "branch" (cf. Isaiah 41:8, 9; 42:1, 19; 43:10; 44:1, 2, 21; Psalm 132:17; Jeremiah 23:5; 33:15).
- "The Branch" (Hebrew: tsemakh): generally seen as a reference to Messiah, coming from the almost extinct royal line of David (Zechariah 6:12; Isaiah 4:2; Isaiah 11:1; Jeremiah 23:5; Jeremiah 33:15). The word is translated by the Septuagint as ἀνατολήν, in the sense of "shoot" as well as "sunrise" (cf. Jeremiah 23:5; Ezekiel 16:7; Ezekiel 17:10), and by the Vulgate as orientem (similarly in the Syriac and Arabic; cf. Luke 1:78). Aben Ezra noted that "many interpreters say this Branch is the Messiah: and he is called Zerubbabel, because he is of his seed, even as he is called David; and David my servant shall be their Prince for ever" (cf. Ezekiel 37:25).

== See also ==
- Joshua the High Priest
- Satan
- Related Bible parts: Isaiah 4, Isaiah 11, Jeremiah 23, Jeremiah 33, Haggai 1, Zechariah 1, Zechariah 2, Zechariah 4, Zechariah 5, Zechariah 6, Luke 1, Revelation 5

== Sources ==
- Boda, Mark J. (2016). Harrison, R. K.; Hubbard, Jr, Robert L. (eds.). The Book of Zechariah. New International Commentary on the Old Testament. Wm. B. Eerdmans Publishing. ISBN 978-0802823755.
- Collins, John J. (2014). Introduction to the Hebrew Scriptures. Fortress Press. ISBN 9781451469233.
- Coogan, Michael David (2007). Coogan, Michael David; Brettler, Marc Zvi; Newsom, Carol Ann; Perkins, Pheme (eds.). The New Oxford Annotated Bible with the Apocryphal/Deuterocanonical Books: New Revised Standard Version, Issue 48 (Augmented 3rd ed.). Oxford University Press. ISBN 9780195288810.
- Fitzmyer, Joseph A. (2008). A Guide to the Dead Sea Scrolls and Related Literature. Grand Rapids, MI: William B. Eerdmans Publishing Company. ISBN 9780802862419.
- Hayes, Christine (2015). Introduction to the Bible. Yale University Press. ISBN 978-0300188271.
- Larkin, Katrina J. A. (2007). "37. Zechariah". In Barton, John; Muddiman, John (eds.). The Oxford Bible Commentary (first (paperback) ed.). Oxford University Press. pp. 610–615. ISBN 978-0199277186.
- Mason, Rex (1993). "Zechariah, The Book of.". In Metzger, Bruce M; Coogan, Michael D (eds.). The Oxford Companion to the Bible. Oxford University Press. ISBN 978-0195046458.
- Rogerson, John W. (2003). "Zechariah". In Dunn, James D. G.; Rogerson, John William (eds.). Eerdmans Commentary on the Bible (illustrated ed.). Wm. B. Eerdmans Publishing. pp. 721–729. ISBN 978-0802837110.
- Ulrich, Eugene, ed. (2010). The Biblical Qumran Scrolls: Transcriptions and Textual Variants. Brill.
- Würthwein, Ernst (1995). The Text of the Old Testament. Translated by Rhodes, Erroll F. Grand Rapids, MI: Wm. B. Eerdmans. ISBN 0-8028-0788-7.
