= Zechariah 4 =

Bible chapter

- ← chapter 3 chapter 5 →
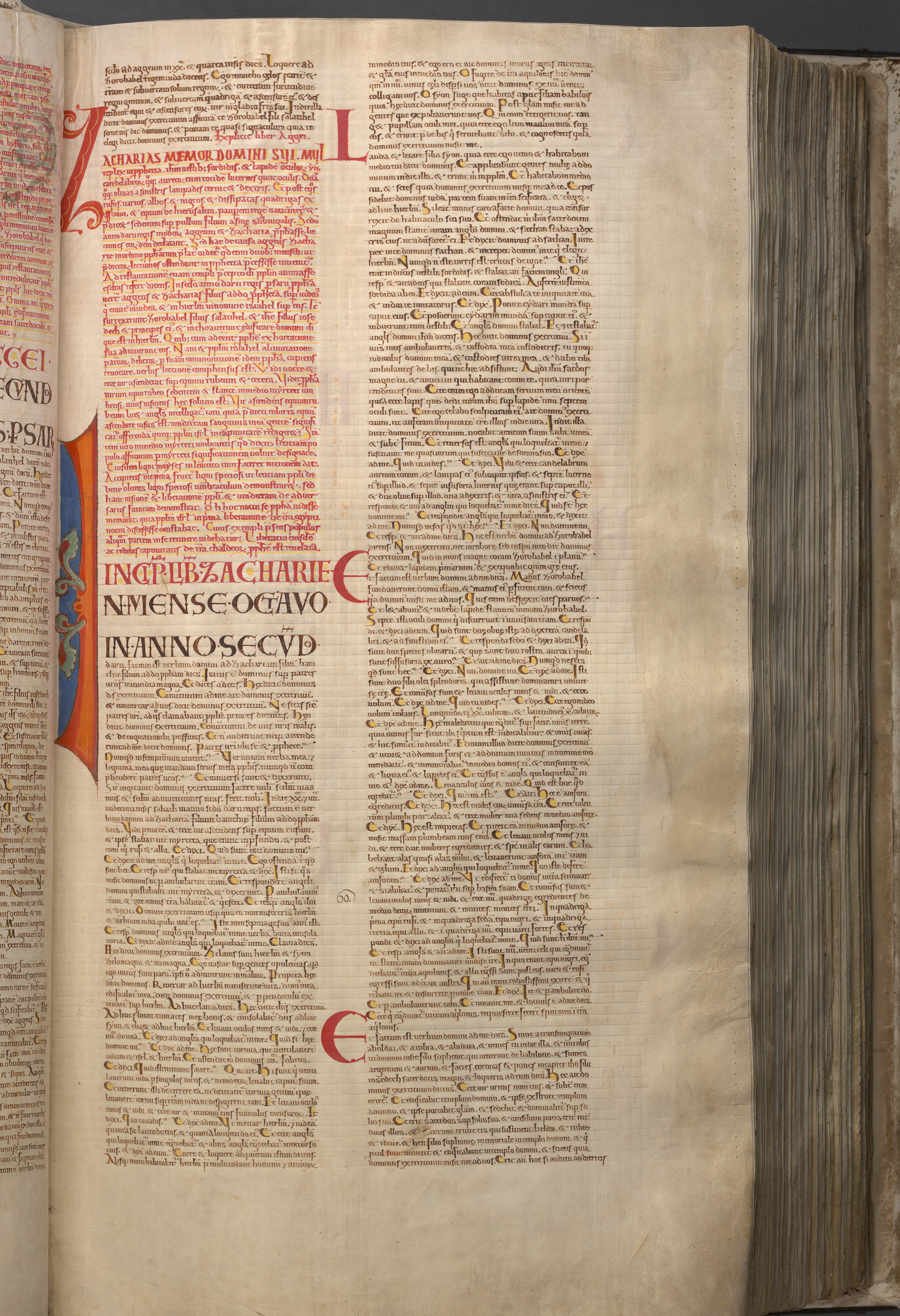
- The beginning part of the Book of Zechariah (1:1-6:15) in Latin in Codex Gigas, made around 13th century.
- Book: Book of Zechariah
- Category: Nevi'im
- Christian Bible part: Old Testament
- Order in the Christian part: 38

Zechariah 4 is the fourth of the 14 chapters in the Book of Zechariah in the Hebrew Bible or the Old Testament of the Christian Bible. This book contains the prophecies attributed to the prophet Zechariah. In the Hebrew Bible it forms part of the Book of the Twelve Minor Prophets. This chapter relates Zechariah's fifth vision. It is a part of a section (so-called "First Zechariah") consisting of Zechariah 1–8.

== Text ==
The original text was written in the Hebrew language. This chapter is divided into 14 verses.

=== Textual witnesses ===
Some early manuscripts containing the text of this chapter in Hebrew are of the Masoretic Text, which includes the Codex Cairensis (from year 895), the Petersburg Codex of the Prophets (916), and Codex Leningradensis (1008). (Note: The Aleppo Codex (930) now only contains Zechariah 9:17b–14:21.)

Fragments containing parts of this chapter were found among the Dead Sea Scrolls, that is, 4Q80 (4QXII^{e}; 75–50 BCE) with extant verses 1–4.

There is also a translation into Koine Greek known as the Septuagint, made in the last few centuries BCE. Extant ancient manuscripts of the Septuagint version include Codex Vaticanus (B; $\mathfrak{G}$^{B}; 4th century), Codex Sinaiticus (S; BHK: $\mathfrak{G}$^{S}; 4th century), Codex Alexandrinus (A; $\mathfrak{G}$^{A}; 5th century) and Codex Marchalianus (Q; $\mathfrak{G}$^{Q}; 6th century).

== Vision of the lampstand and olive trees (verses 1–6) ==
The fifth of the eight visions uses the 'seal imagery' of the golden lamp and the olive-tree to symbolize two joint leaders appointed to do the works for God: Joshua the high priest and the Davidic descendant and governor, Zerubbabel.

=== Verse 6 ===
So he answered and said to me:
“This is the word of the Lord to Zerubbabel:
‘Not by might nor by power, but by My Spirit,’
Says the Lord of hosts."

- "Not by might": Zerubabbel's work will be accomplished through the grace of God alone. Septuagint: "not by great might", but the Vulgate renders it: "not by an army". Zerubbabel might feel dispirited thinking how much there was to do with so few at his disposal (Nehemiah 4:2), and how formidable the opposition, so this message reassure him of the promise of Divine aid, knowing that God regards him precious (Haggai 2:23) as a servant of the Lord, and governor of Judah (Haggai 1:1).
- "But by my Spirit": the work is to be effected by the living Spirit (cf. Haggai 2:5) of God, unaffected by man's weakness, because God's might will bring strength out of weakness (Hosea 1:7; 2 Corinthians 12:10; Hebrews 11:34). Also in the might of God's Spirit He appointed in the Church "first Apostles, then prophets and evangelists" 1 Corinthians 12:28, 'filling them with divine gifts and enriching them by the influx of His Spirit'.

== Oracle of response (verses 7–14) ==
While the task to build the temple falls mainly on Zerubabbel, the two leaders are both God's "anointed ones".

=== Verse 10 ===
For whoever has despised the day of small things shall rejoice, and shall see the plumb line in the hand of Zerubbabel.
These seven are the eyes of the Lord, which range through the whole earth.

Theologian Katrina Larkin suggests that the reference to a "day of small things" indicates that the restoration of the temple in Jerusalem is not to be mistaken for an eschatological "golden age".

=== Verse 14 ===
Then he said, "These are the two anointed ones who stand by the Lord of the whole earth."

The Hebrew words used mean "sons of oil" (or "sons of new oil"), and refer to Zerubbabel and Joshua. The phrase comes from the same root as the word "messiah".

== See also ==
- Lampstand
- Olive
- Zerubbabel
- Related Bible parts: Haggai 1, Zechariah 1, Zechariah 2, Zechariah 3, Zechariah 5, Zechariah 6
