= Isaiah 3 =

Book of Isaiah, chapter 3

- ← chapter 2 chapter 4 →
- The Great Isaiah Scroll, the best preserved of the biblical scrolls found at Qumran from the second century BC, contains all the verses in this chapter.
- Book: Book of Isaiah
- Hebrew Bible part: Nevi'im
- Order in the Hebrew part: 5
- Category: Latter Prophets
- Christian Bible part: Old Testament
- Order in the Christian part: 23

Isaiah 3 is the third chapter of the Book of Isaiah in the Hebrew Bible or the Old Testament of the Christian Bible. This book contains the prophecies attributed to the prophet Isaiah, and is one of the Books of the Prophets. This chapter describes how the corrupt leadership brought about the collapse of the social condition of Jerusalem, and contains Isaiah's prophecies that "For the sin of the people, God will take away the wise men, and give them foolish princes".

== Text ==
The original text was written in Hebrew language. This chapter is divided into 26 verses.

=== Textual witnesses ===
Some early manuscripts containing the text of this chapter in Hebrew are of the Masoretic Text tradition, which includes some fragments among Dead Sea Scrolls, such as the Isaiah Scroll (1Qlsa^{a}; 356-100 BCE; all verses) and 4QIsa^{b} (4Q56; with extant verses 14–22); as well as codices, such as Codex Cairensis (895 CE), the Petersburg Codex of the Prophets (916), Aleppo Codex (10th century), Codex Leningradensis (1008).

There is also a translation into Koine Greek known as the Septuagint, made in the last few centuries BCE. Extant ancient manuscripts of the Septuagint version include Codex Vaticanus (B; $\mathfrak{G}$^{B}; 4th century), Codex Sinaiticus (S; BHK: $\mathfrak{G}$^{S}; 4th century), Codex Alexandrinus (A; $\mathfrak{G}$^{A}; 5th century) and Codex Marchalianus (Q; $\mathfrak{G}$^{Q}; 6th century).

== Parashot ==
The parashah sections listed here are based on the Aleppo Codex. Isaiah 3 is a part of the Prophecies about Judah and Israel (Isaiah 1-12). {P}: open parashah; {S}: closed parashah.

{P} 3:1-12 {P} 3:13-15 {S} 3:16-17 {S} 3:18-26 [4:1 {S}]

== Structure ==
Motyer divides this chapter into two sections:

- 3:1-15: shows the collapse of human leadership in contrast to the action of "the Lord, the LORD Almighty"
- 3:16-4:1: shows how the divine judgement work out, transforming prosperity into poverty, and prepares for the vision of the Lord's next action (described in Isaiah 4).

== Judgement on Jerusalem and Judah (3:1–15) ==
Verses 1-15 speaks of the imminent collapse of the society in a unified composition within the inclusion of the phrase "the Lord, the LORD Almighty" (LORD of hosts), as follows:

A^{1} The act of the Lord, the LORD Almighty (verse 1a)

B^{1} The collapse of leadership and social disorder (verses 1b-5)

C^{1} Vignette: leadership debased (verse 6-7)

D^{1} Jerusalem's collapse explained (verse 8)
D^{2} Jerusalem's judgment pronounced (verses 9-11)

B^{2} Social oppression and misleading leaders (verse 12)

C^{2} Vignette: leadership brought to trial (verses 13-15a)

A^{2} The word of the Lord, the LORD Almighty (verse 15b)

=== Verse 1 ===
For, behold, the Lord, the LORD of hosts, doth take away from Jerusalem and from Judah the stay and the staff, the whole stay of bread, and the whole stay of water

- "For": translated from כי, ki, as the opening word to the chapter, connecting to the last verse in the previous chapter (2:22), justifying "the call to stop trusting in man."
- "The Lord, the LORD of hosts" (NIV: "The Lord, the LORD Almighty): translated from האדון יהוה צבאות, ha-’ā-ḏō-wn YHWH tsə-ḇā-’ō-wṯ
- "The stay and the staff" (ESV: "support and supply"): translated from משען ומשענה, mash-‘ên ū-mash-‘ê-nāh, where "mashenah" is the feminine form of the masculine word "mashen", so here the masculine and feminine forms of the noun are used, symbolising completeness. Keil and Delitzsch render them as "supporter and means of support", and, among all, "bread" and "water" are first named as the "two indispensable conditions and the lowest basis of human life". Both alludes to "the structure of the society, without which there would be chaos."

=== Verse 15 ===
King James Version

What mean ye that ye beat my people to pieces, and grind the faces of the poor? saith the Lord GOD of hosts.

New International Version

"... What do you mean by crushing my people and grinding the faces of the poor?" declares the Lord, the LORD Almighty.

- "What mean ye" (NIV: "What do you mean"): from the Hebrew word written (כ) as מלכם, but read (ק) as מה ־לכם, mah-lakem, literally, according to Rashi, "What is to you?"
- "Beat ... to pieces" (NIV: "crushing"): translated from תדכאו, derived from the root word דָּכָא, daka, also meaning "to bruise, to break in pieces, to oppress, to contrite".
- "The Lord GOD of hosts" (NIV: "The Lord, the LORD Almighty): translated from אדני יהוה צבאות, ’ă-ḏō-nāy YHWH tsə-ḇā-’ō-wṯ

== A warning to the daughters of Zion (3:16–26) ==
There are two contrasts in this section: the first one (verses 16–17) shows how the daughters of Zion are blemished as God's judgment falls on sinners, whereas the second contrast (verses 18–24) itemizes the luxury in life's ease which will be lost in sorrow. According to Susanne Scholz (2010), there is a common mistranslation of the Hebrew word pōt as "forehead" or "scalp". Also often translated as "genitals" or "secret parts", Scholz believes that a more accurate translation of the word in context is "cunt", as first suggested by J. Cheryl Exum's The Ethics of Biblical Violence against Women (1995). They and other scholars such as Johnny Miles (2006) conclude that this stripping of women's clothes to expose their genitals refers to sexual violence as God's punishment for women's arrogance and pride.

=== Verse 16 ===
Moreover the Lord says:

“Because the daughters of Zion are haughty,
And walk with outstretched necks
And wanton eyes,
Walking and mincing as they go,
Making a jingling with their feet. (NKJV)

Cross reference: Psalm 75

=== Verse 17 ===
Therefore the Lord will strike with a scab
The crown of the head of the daughters of Zion,
And the LORD will uncover their secret parts.” (NKJV)

=== Clothing and finery of the daughters of Zion ===
Source: Isaiah 3:18–24

In that day the Lord will take away the finery:

| Hebrew | Transliteration | English |
|---|---|---|
| תפארת | tip̄-’e-reṯ | bravery/finery |
| עכסים | ‘ă-ḵā-sîm | tinkling ornaments/anklets/fetters |
| שביסים | shə-ḇî-sîm* | cauls/headbands |
| שהרנים | sha-hă-rō-nîm | round tires/crescents/crescent ornaments |
| נטיפות | nə-ṭî-p̄ō-wṯ | chains/pendants |
| שירות | shê-rō-wṯ | bracelets |
| רעלות | rə-‘ā-lō-wṯ. | mufflers/scarfs |
| פארים | pə-’ê-rîm | bonnets/headdresses/caps |
| צעדות | tsə-‘ā-ḏō-wṯ | armlets/ornaments of the legs |
| קשרים | qi-shu-rîm | headbands/sashes |
| בתי הנפש | ḇā-tê ha-ne-p̄eš | tablets/sachets/perfume boxes/bottles |
| לחשים | lə-ḥā-shîm. | earrings/amulets/charms |
| טבעות | ṭa-bā-‘ō-wṯ | (signet) rings |
| נזמי האף | niz-mê hā-’āp̄. | nose rings/jewels |
| מחלצות | ma-ḥă-lā-tsō-wṯ | festal robes/changeable suits of apparel/fine robes |
| מעטפות | ma-‘ă-ṭā-p̄ō-wṯ, | mantles/capes |
| מטפחות | miṭ-pā-ḥō-wṯ | wimples/cloaks/shawls |
| חריטים | ḥă-rî-ṭîm. | crisping pins/(money) purses/handbags |
| גלינים | gil-yō-nîm | glasses/mirrors/garments of gauze |
| סדינים | sə-ḏî-nîm, | fine linens/linen garments/undergarments |
| צניפות | tsə-nî-p̄ō-wṯ | hoods/turbans/tiaras |
| רדידים | rə-ḏî-ḏîm | veils |
| בשם | bō-shem | sweet smell/fragrance/perfume |
| חגורה | kha-ḡō-w-rāh | sash/girdle/belt/apron |
| מעשה מקשה | ma-‘ă-sheh miq-sheh | well-set hairdo |
| פתיגיל | pə-thî-ḡîl* | stomacher/fine clothing/rich robe |

* hapax legomenon

==== Verse 24 ====
And so it shall be:

Instead of a sweet smell there will be a stench;
Instead of a sash, a rope;
Instead of well-set hair, baldness;
Instead of a rich robe, a girding of sackcloth;
And branding instead of beauty.

- "Branding": or "burning scar": from כִּי, ki, a noun form only used here in the whole Bible which is "an unexceptionable formation" from כָּוָה, kawah (Isaiah 43:2; Proverbs 6:28; Exodus 21:25; Leviticus 13:24). It is used here, with the reverse word order compared to the previous four sets of items, to achieve a rhyme (ki ṯa-ḥaṯ yō-p̄î) to end the list and to give "the effect of a tailing off into sadness".

All the luxury the people enjoyed was itemized (verses 18–23), and then with five times "instead" (verse 24), their ease would be exchanged for mourning.

=== Verses 3:25–4:1 ===
This section, which continues to 4:1, states without any imagery how the city in actuality is bereft.

==== Verse 25 ====
Your men shall fall by the sword,
And your mighty in the war.

- "Mighty": lit. "strength". This verse shows that "sin ends in death."

== See also ==
- Sodom
- Related Bible parts: Genesis 13, Leviticus 26, Deuteronomy 28, Psalm 75, Isaiah 2, Isaiah 4, Micah 3

== Sources ==
- Coggins, R (2007). "22. Isaiah". In Barton, John; Muddiman, John (eds.). The Oxford Bible Commentary (first (paperback) ed.). Oxford University Press. pp. 433–486. ISBN 978-0199277186.
- Motyer, J. Alec (2015). The Prophecy of Isaiah: An Introduction & Commentary. InterVarsity Press. ISBN 9780830895243.
- Würthwein, Ernst (1995). The Text of the Old Testament. Translated by Rhodes, Erroll F. Grand Rapids, MI: Wm. B. Eerdmans. ISBN 0-8028-0788-7.
