= Zechariah 1 =

Bible chapter

- ← Haggai 2 chapter 2 →
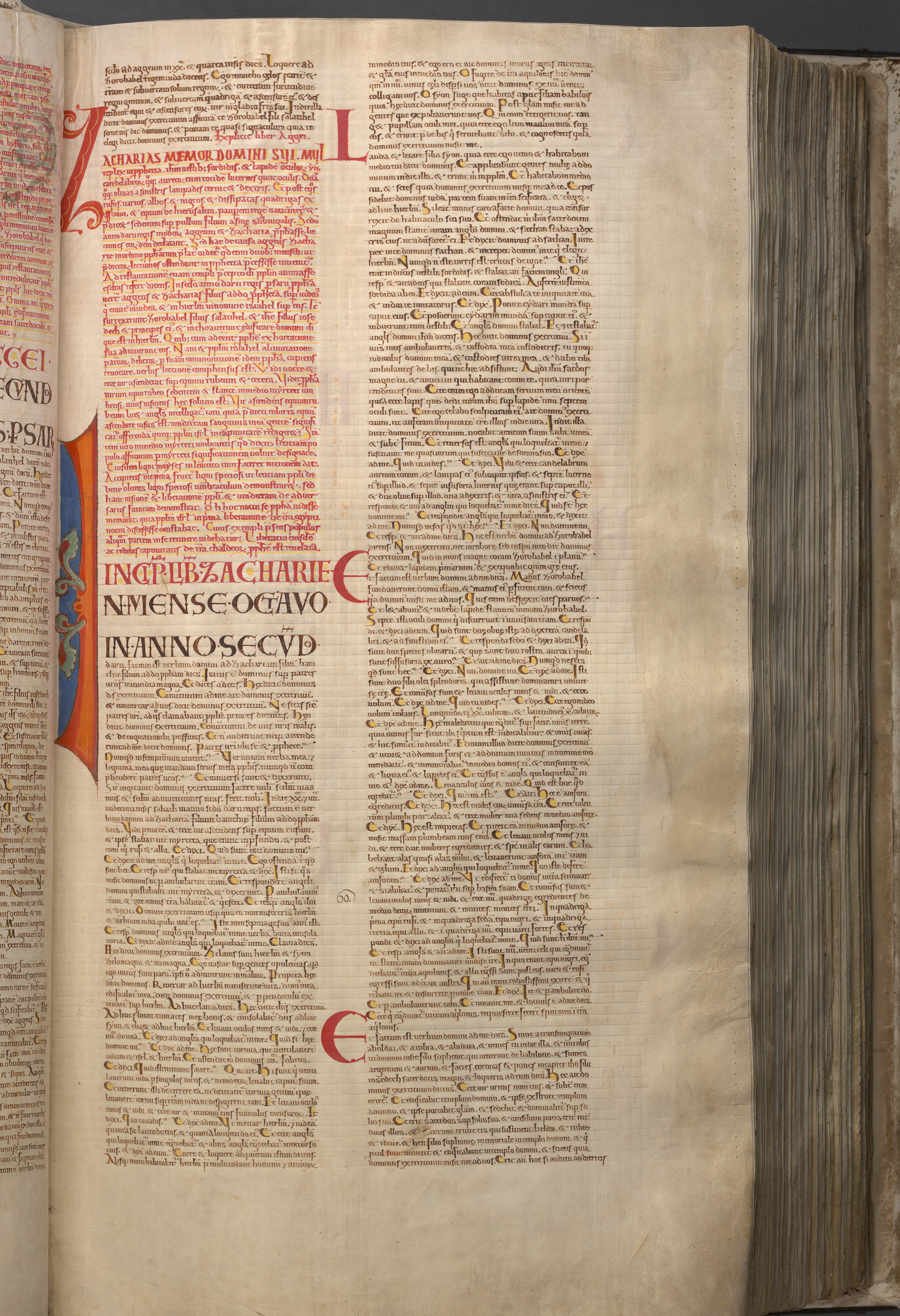
- The beginning of the Book of Zechariah (1:1–6:15) in Latin in Codex Gigas, circa 13th century.
- Book: Book of Zechariah
- Category: Nevi'im
- Christian Bible part: Old Testament
- Order in the Christian part: 38

Zechariah 1 is the first chapter (Note: Chapter numbers were first used in the Vulgate Bible in 13th century.) of the Book of Zechariah in the Hebrew Bible or the Old Testament of the Christian Bible. This book contains the prophecies attributed to the prophet Zechariah. In the Hebrew Bible it forms a part of the Book of the Twelve Minor Prophets. As the first of the 14 chapters in the book, this chapter is a part of a section (so-called "First Zechariah") consisting of Zechariah 1-8. It records an introduction and the first two of the eight visions received by the prophet. These visions are the book's primary and most distinctive feature, with a highly literary and standardized format, structured in a concentric pattern.

== Text ==
The original text was written in the Hebrew language. This chapter is divided into 21 verses in English Bibles. (Note: Moore 1893, pp. 73–78 notes that verse numbers were first used by Rabbi Isaac Nathan in a Hebrew concordance of Masoretic Text in the 15th century, but not fully printed in a Hebrew Bible until the publication of the Antwerp Polyglott of 1569, whereas Pagninus' Latin Bible of 1528 was published with Arabic numerals for every verse in the whole book.) There are some differences between the chapter and verse numbering of this chapter in English Bibles and in Hebrew texts:

| English | Hebrew |
|---|---|
| 1:1-17 | 1:1-16 |
| 1:18-21 | 2:1-4 |

This article generally follows the common numbering in Christian English Bible versions, with notes to the numbering in Hebrew Bible versions.

=== Textual witnesses ===
Some early manuscripts containing the text of this chapter in Hebrew are of the Masoretic Text, which includes the Codex Cairensis (from year 895), the Petersburg Codex of the Prophets (916), and Codex Leningradensis (1008). (Note: Boda 2016, p. 3 notes that the Aleppo Codex (930) now only contains Zechariah 9:17b–14:21.)

Fragments containing parts of this chapter were found among the Dead Sea Scrolls, including: 4Q80 (4QXII^{e}; 75–50 BCE) with extant verses 4–6, 8–10, 13–15, and Mur88 (MurXII; from Wadi Murabba'at; from early 2nd century CE) with extant verses 1–4.

There is also a translation into Koine Greek known as the Septuagint (with a different verse numbering), made in the last few centuries BCE. Extant ancient manuscripts of the Septuagint version include Codex Vaticanus (B; $\mathfrak{G}$^{B}; 4th century), Codex Sinaiticus (S; BHK: $\mathfrak{G}$^{S}; 4th century), Codex Alexandrinus (A; $\mathfrak{G}$^{A}; 5th century) and Codex Marchalianus (Q; $\mathfrak{G}$^{Q}; 6th century). Some fragments containing parts of this chapter (a revision of the Septuagint) were found among the Dead Sea Scrolls, i.e., Naḥal Ḥever 8Ḥev1 (8ḤevXII^{gr}); late 1st century BCE) with extant verses 1–4, 12–14, 19–21 (verses 2:2–4 in Masoretic verse numbering)

== Time ==
This chapter contains two dating formulae, in verses 1 and 7, which place the recorded events in the year of 520-519 BCE, "in the second year of Darius" (son of Hystaspes), the king of Persia. Accordingly, Zechariah was a contemporary of the prophet Haggai, confirming the records in Ezra 5:1 and Ezra 6:14.

- Verse 1: "in the eighth month" corresponds to mid October–mid November 520 BCE.
- Verse 7: "the four and twentieth day of the eleventh month" corresponds to a date between mid-January and mid-February 519 BCE.

== Preface (1:1–6) ==
Verses 1–6 serve as an introduction to the subsequent visions and prophecies received by Zechariah with a call for the people to repentance. This section and chapters 7 and 8, form an editorial frame for the first section of the book.

=== Verse 1 ===
In the eighth month, in the second year of Darius,

came the word of the Lord unto Zechariah, the son of Berechiah, the son of Iddo the prophet,

saying,

- "The eighth month, in the second year of Darius" corresponds to mid October-mid November 520 BCE. Two months before, "in the sixth month"^{(Haggai 1:1)} Haggai, conjointly with Zechariah, exhorted Zerubbabel and the people to resume the interrupted building of the temple, despite the partial discouragement of the Persian Government, and "in the seventh month" Haggai conveyed the magnificent promise about 'the later glory of the temple'.). However, Haggai also warned them, that the conversion was not complete, and Zechariah "in the eighth month", as well as Haggai "in the ninth month",), urges a "thorough and inward repentance", as the condition of receiving God's promises.
- "The eighth month" was called Bul before the Captivity, and afterward Marchesvan; corresponds to parts of October and November, usually a time of rain in the area.
- "Darius": Darius son of Hystaspes, and the third Persian monarch:; not to be confused with Darius the Mede.
- "Zechariah": The name means "one whom Jehovah remembers": a common name, four others of the same name occurring in the Old Testament. Like Jeremiah and Ezekiel, he was a priest as well as a prophet, which adapts him for the sacerdotal character of some of his prophecies. He is called "the son of Berechiah, the son of Iddo"; but simply "the son of Iddo" in Ezra 5:1 and Ezra 6:14. Probably his father died when he was young; and hence, as sometimes occurs in Jewish genealogies, he is called "the son of Iddo," his grandfather. Iddo was one of the priests who returned to Zerubbabel and Joshua from Babylon.) He was murdered on a Day of Atonement in the Second Temple in Jerusalem, because of his admonishment, according to the Targum Lamentations 2:20. This was mentioned by Jesus Christ as recorded in Matthew 23:29–36: "...shedding the blood of the prophets... from the blood of the righteous Abel to the blood of Zechariah son of Barachiah, whom you murdered between the sanctuary and the altar". There is another Zechariah son of the priest Jehoiada that was murdered as recorded in 2 Chronicles 24:20–21, but this Zechariah is from the 9th century, during the First Temple period, before the exile to Babylon, and he was killed by officials of Judah who wanted to worship pagan deities, not by priests.
- "The son of Iddo the prophet": the word "prophet", as Kimchi observes, belongs to Zechariah; not but that his grandfather Iddo might be a prophet too; and the same writer takes notice, that in the Midrash mention is made of Iddo the prophet; and so there is an Iddo that is called the seer and the prophet in 2 Chronicles 9:29.

=== Verse 4 ===
Do not be like your fathers, to whom the former prophets cried out, "Thus says the LORD of hosts, Return from your evil ways and from your evil deeds." But they did not hear or pay attention to me, declares the Lord.

The reference to the "former prophets" or "earlier prophets" probably includes "the whole body of prophets" prior to time of Haggai and Zechariah.

== Vision of horses (1:7–17) ==
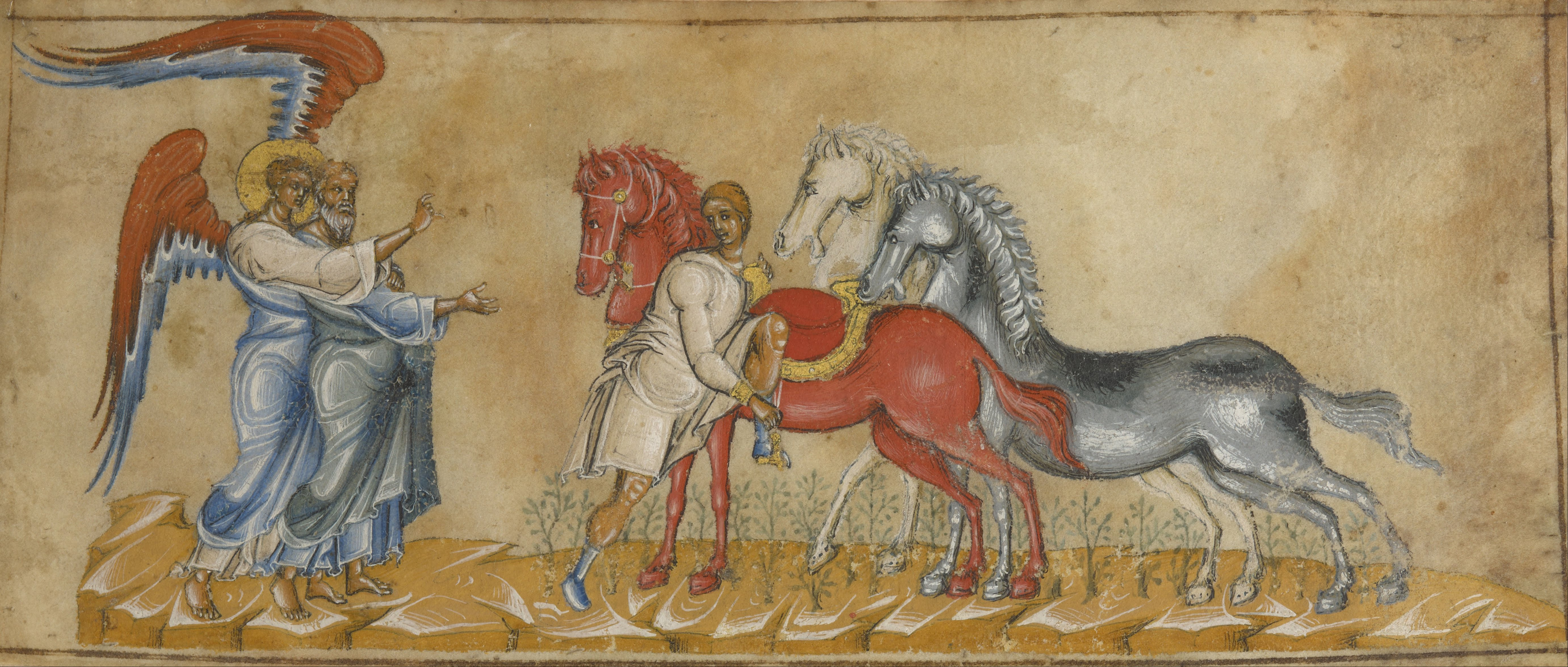
"The Vision of Zechariah". A miniature from Sicily (circa 1300) shows Zechariah's first vision. Zechariah stands on the left, next to an angel who points to a man mounting a red horse.

In the first of Zechariah's eight night visions, a dialogue takes place involving the prophet, the angel of the LORD and the Lord of Hosts. The earth is peaceful and at rest, patrolled by the four horsemen (the first of numerous symbols from Zechariah to be reused in the Book of Revelation). The 'seventy years' of the Lord's withholding mercy are fulfilled, the people are to return to Jerusalem, and the temple is to be rebuilt.

=== Verse 7 ===
Upon the four and twentieth day of the eleventh month, which is the month Sebat, in the second year of Darius,

came the word of the Lord unto Zechariah, the son of Berechiah, the son of Iddo the prophet,

saying,

- "The four and twentieth day of the eleventh month ... in the second year of Darius" corresponds to mid-January to mid-February 519 BCE, exactly five months after the building of the temple was resumed, and two months after Haggai's final prophecy.
- "the month Sebat": The Hebrew month "Shevat" (called here by its Chaldean name) answered to parts of January and February. It was three months since Zechariah had been called to the prophetical office, and two months after Haggai delivered his final prophecies, so now Zechariah carries on the revelation. The term is Chaldee, meaning a "shoot", namely, the month when trees begin to "shoot" or "bud". Called Sabat in the Septuagint version, and in the Apocrypha.

=== Verse 8 ===
"I saw in the night, and behold, a man riding on a red horse! He was standing among the myrtle trees in the glen, and behind him were red, sorrel, and white horses.

The Jerusalem Bible adds reference to a black horse.

== Vision of the horns and craftsmen (1:18–21) ==
The second vision contains the symbolism of the 'powerful nations that have terrorized the chosen people' and the 'counterforces ("blacksmiths" or "craftsmen") raised by YHWH'.

=== Verse 20 ===
Then the Lord showed me four craftsmen.^{[Zechariah 2:3 Hebrew Bible]}

- "Craftsmen" (MEV, NASB, NIV, NKJV): from Hebrew חָרָשִֽׁים, khā-rā-shîm; KJV: "carpenters"; NET Bible: "blacksmiths"; a generic term which can mean "metalworker, smith, armorer". (Note: HALOT 358 s.v. חָרָשׁ; apud note [a] on Zechariah 1:20 in NET.)

=== Verse 21 ===
And I said, "What are these coming to do?"
And he said, "These are the horns that scattered Judah after which no one could raise his head; and these four craftsmen have come to terrify and throw down the horns of the nations who lifted up their horn against the land of Judah to scatter it."^{[Zechariah 2:4 Hebrew Bible]}

- "These four craftsmen": lit. "these", (Note: Note [a] on Zechariah 1:21 NKJV) referring to the four persons in previous verse. As the horns are perhaps made of strong metal (representing oppressive nations with strong military), they can only be cut off by "craftsmen" or "blacksmiths", who represent 'deliverers whom the Lord raises up, such as kings like Cyrus of Persia'. (Note: Note [a] on Zechariah 1:21 NET)

== See also ==
- Berechiah
- Darius
- Cheshvan
- Four Horsemen of the Apocalypse
- Iddo
- Judah
- Jerusalem
- Shevat
- Related Bible parts: Ezra 5, Ezra 6, Jeremiah 25, Jeremiah 29, Daniel 9, Haggai 1, Haggai 2, Zechariah 2, Zechariah 3, Zechariah 4, Zechariah 5, Zechariah 6, Matthew 23, Revelation 6
