= Zechariah 5 =

Bible chapter

- ← chapter 4 chapter 6 →
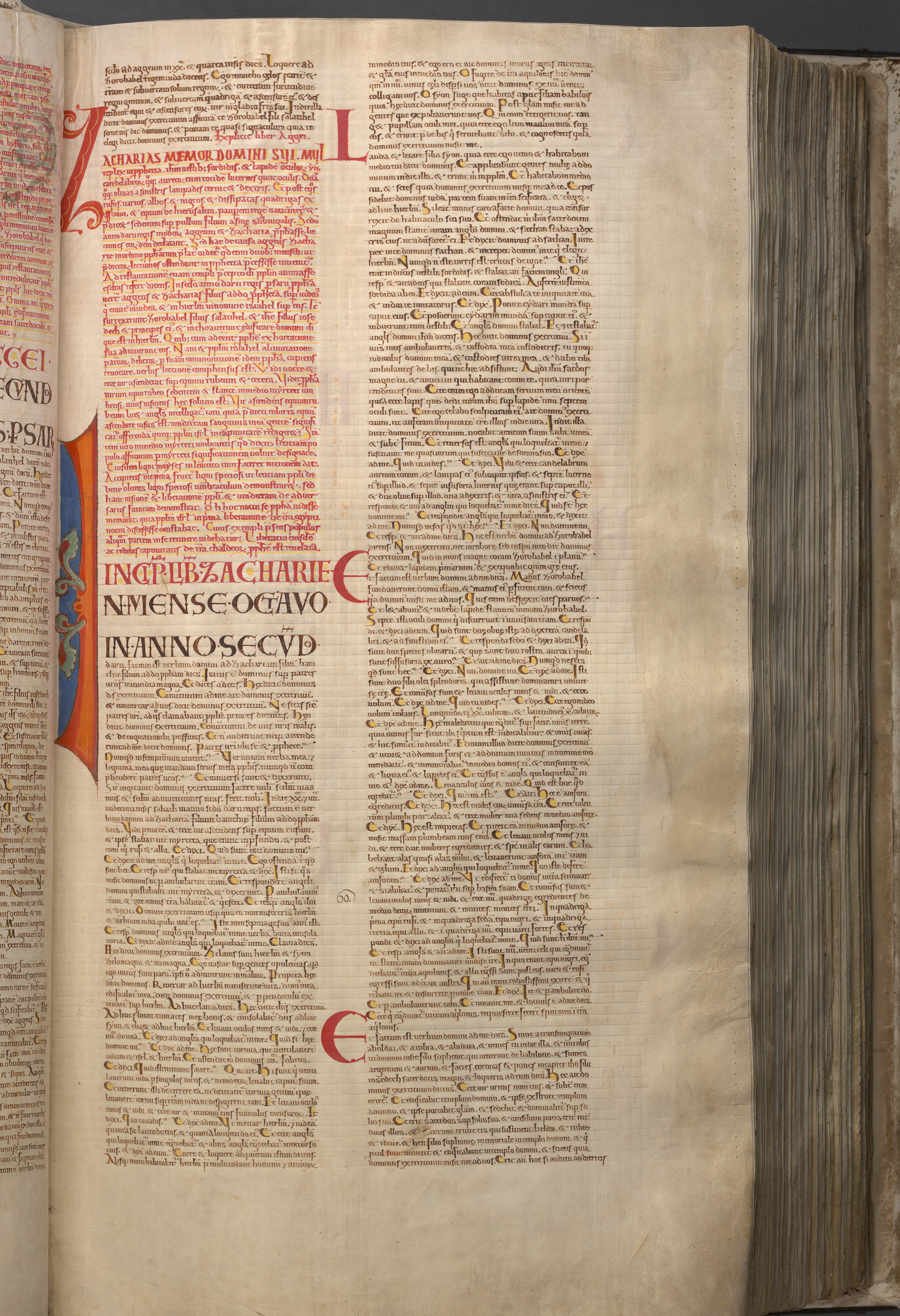
- The beginning part of the Book of Zechariah (1:1-6:15) in Latin in Codex Gigas, made around 13th century.
- Book: Book of Zechariah
- Category: Nevi'im
- Christian Bible part: Old Testament
- Order in the Christian part: 38

Zechariah 5 is the fifth of the 14 chapters in the Book of Zechariah in the Hebrew Bible or the Old Testament of the Christian Bible. This book contains the prophecies attributed to the prophet Zechariah. In the Hebrew Bible it forms a part of the Book of the Twelve Minor Prophets. This chapter records the sixth and seventh of the eight visions of Zechariah, the flying scroll and the woman in a basket, which are compiled in a section (so-called "First Zechariah") consisting of Zechariah 1–8.

== Text ==
The original text was written in the Hebrew language. This chapter is divided into 11 verses.

=== Textual witnesses ===
Some early manuscripts containing the text of this chapter in Hebrew are of the Masoretic Text, which includes the Codex Cairensis (from year 895), the Petersburg Codex of the Prophets (916), and Codex Leningradensis (1008). (Note: The Aleppo Codex (930) now only contains Zechariah 9:17b–14:21.)

Fragments containing parts of this chapter were found among the Dead Sea Scrolls, that is, 4Q80 (4QXII^{e}; 75–50 BCE) with extant verses 8–11.

There is also a translation into Koine Greek known as the Septuagint, made in the last few centuries BCE. Extant ancient manuscripts of the Septuagint version include Codex Vaticanus (B; $\mathfrak{G}$^{B}; 4th century), Codex Sinaiticus (S; BHK: $\mathfrak{G}$^{S}; 4th century), Codex Alexandrinus (A; $\mathfrak{G}$^{A}; 5th century) and Codex Marchalianus (Q; $\mathfrak{G}$^{Q}; 6th century).

== Vision of the flying scroll (verses 1–4) ==
These verses contain the sixth vision. The shortest of the visionary accounts recalls a flying scroll, which biblical scholar Katrina Larkin calls "the word of the Lord in materialized form". The prophet Ezekiel also has a vision of a scroll: in his case, the prophet is commanded to eat the scroll. The scroll is an instrument of judgment used against those who break the commandments, those who steal and those who swear falsely. Larkin explains that "the invocation of the covenant curse shows that the covenant does remain in force despite having once been broken".

== Vision of a woman in a basket (verses 5–11) ==
The seventh of the eight visions uncovers a woman in a basket (Hebrew: 'epa), who symbolises the iniquity of the people (Hebrew 'eye'), and then another two women "with the wind in their wings". A feminine idol (to be stood 'on its base' in a 'house' or temple) is to be symbolically exiled to Babylon while Judaism becomes fully a YHWH-alone religion.

The German commentators Carl Friedrich Keil and Franz Delitzsch argue that the sixth and the seventh visions are parts of a single vision, and therefore they only enumerate seven visions in all.

=== Verse 7 ===
And, behold, there was lifted up a talent of lead:

and this is a woman that sitteth in the midst of the ephah.

- "Talent" (Hebrew:kikkar): may denote a 'circle' as in Genesis 13:10, 12 for an area where the Jordan was the center, or in 1 Samuel 2:36 for 'a round loaf', but here it refers to a 'disc or circular plate' forming the cover of the round shaped ephah. In the next verse it is called, "the weight of lead."
- "A talent of lead": A kikkar (or cicar), or "talent of silver" in the Jewish tradition was equal to 3,000 shekels (Exodus 38:24 and weighed between 120 and 125 pounds. (Note: Other measurements from the neighboring area: a Babylonian talent weighed 72 Attic pounds; and an Attic mina, or pound, weighed 100 drachmas, so one talent weighed 7,200 drachmas, according to Aelianus. An Alexandrian talent was equal to 12,000 Attic drachmas, which was the same as 125 Roman libras or pounds, supposedly the same with that of Moses. The Roman talent contained 72 Italic minas, which were the same as the Roman libras.) Since the Hebrew word "cicar" signifies something 'plain', and 'extended like a cake', as Arias Montanus observes, it may here refer to a plate of lead, which was laid over the mouth of the "ephah", as a lid unto it; though indeed it is afterwards called, "a stone of lead", and so seems to design a weight.
- "This is a woman" - Literally, "one woman", who personified 'all sins' or 'wickedness' (cf. Proverbs 2:16; 5:3, 4). The sitting may represent her abiding tranquil condition in her sins, according to the climax in Psalm 1:1-6, "and hath not sat in the seat of the scornful" (Psalm 1:1); and, "thou sittest and speakest against thy brother" (Psalm 50:20).

=== Verses 10-11 ===
^{10} Then I said to the angel who talked with me, "Where are they taking the basket?" ^{11} He said to me, “To the land of Shinar, to build a house for it. And when this is prepared, they will set the basket down there on its base."

The two women "with the wind in their wings" will take the basket and the woman within it to Babylon (here rendered as Shinar), where a temple dedicated to wickedness is to be constructed. In doing so, Jerusalem will be rid of wickedness.

== See also ==
- Shinar
- Related Bible parts: Zechariah 1, Zechariah 2, Zechariah 3, Zechariah 4, Zechariah 6

== Sources ==
- Boda, Mark J. (2016). Harrison, R. K.; Hubbard, Jr, Robert L. (eds.). The Book of Zechariah. New International Commentary on the Old Testament. Wm. B. Eerdmans Publishing. ISBN 978-0802823755.
- Collins, John J. (2014). Introduction to the Hebrew Scriptures. Fortress Press. ISBN 9781451469233.
- Coogan, Michael David (2007). Coogan, Michael David; Brettler, Marc Zvi; Newsom, Carol Ann; Perkins, Pheme (eds.). The New Oxford Annotated Bible with the Apocryphal/Deuterocanonical Books: New Revised Standard Version, Issue 48 (Augmented 3rd ed.). Oxford University Press. ISBN 9780195288810.
- Fitzmyer, Joseph A. (2008). A Guide to the Dead Sea Scrolls and Related Literature. Grand Rapids, MI: William B. Eerdmans Publishing Company. ISBN 9780802862419.
- Hayes, Christine (2015). Introduction to the Bible. Yale University Press. ISBN 978-0300188271.
- Larkin, Katrina J. A. (2007). "37. Zechariah". In Barton, John; Muddiman, John (eds.). The Oxford Bible Commentary (first (paperback) ed.). Oxford University Press. pp. 610–615. ISBN 978-0199277186.
- Mason, Rex (1993). "Zechariah, The Book of.". In Metzger, Bruce M; Coogan, Michael D (eds.). The Oxford Companion to the Bible. Oxford University Press. ISBN 978-0195046458.
- Ulrich, Eugene, ed. (2010). The Biblical Qumran Scrolls: Transcriptions and Textual Variants. Brill.
- Würthwein, Ernst (1995). The Text of the Old Testament. Translated by Rhodes, Erroll F. Grand Rapids, MI: Wm. B. Eerdmans. ISBN 0-8028-0788-7.
