= Isaiah 4 =

Book of Isaiah, chapter 4

- ← chapter 3 chapter 5 →
- The Great Isaiah Scroll, the best preserved of the biblical scrolls found at Qumran from the second century BC, contains all the verses in this chapter.
- Book: Book of Isaiah
- Hebrew Bible part: Nevi'im
- Order in the Hebrew part: 5
- Category: Latter Prophets
- Christian Bible part: Old Testament
- Order in the Christian part: 23

Isaiah 4 is the fourth chapter of the Book of Isaiah in the Hebrew Bible or the Old Testament of the Christian Bible. This book contains the prophecies attributed to the prophet Isaiah, and is one of the Books of the Prophets.

== Text ==
The original text was written in Hebrew language. This chapter is the shortest in the Book of Isaiah, with only 6 verses. American theologian Albert Barnes argued that "there was no reason why these six verses should have been made a separate chapter" from Isaiah 3.

The New King James Version calls verses 2-6 "The Renewal of Zion".

=== Textual witnesses ===
Some early manuscripts containing the text of this chapter in Hebrew are of the Masoretic Text tradition, which includes the Codex Cairensis (895), the Petersburg Codex of the Prophets (916), Aleppo Codex (10th century), Codex Leningradensis (1008).

Fragments containing parts of this chapter were found among the Dead Sea Scrolls (3rd century BC or later):

- 1QIsa^{a}: complete
- 4QIsa^{a} (4Q55): extant: verses 5-6

There is also a translation into Koine Greek known as the Septuagint, made in the last few centuries BCE. Extant ancient manuscripts of the Septuagint version include Codex Vaticanus (B; $\mathfrak{G}$^{B}; 4th century), Codex Sinaiticus (S; BHK: $\mathfrak{G}$^{S}; 4th century), Codex Alexandrinus (A; $\mathfrak{G}$^{A}; 5th century) and Codex Marchalianus (Q; $\mathfrak{G}$^{Q}; 6th century).

== Parashot ==
The parashah sections listed here are based on the Aleppo Codex. Isaiah 4 is a part of the Prophecies about Judah and Israel (Isaiah 1-12). {P}: open parashah; {S}: closed parashah.

[{S} 3:18-26] 4:1 {S} 4:2-6 {P}

== Jerusalem's future (3:25–4:1) ==
This section, which started at 3:25, states without any imagery how the city in actuality is bereft.

=== Verse 1 ===
And in that day seven women shall take hold of one man, saying,

"We will eat our own food and wear our own apparel;
Only let us be called by your name,
To take away our reproach."

The New King James Version treats verse 1 as a continuation of chapter 3 and Reformation theologian John Calvin argued that "this verse certainly ought not to have been separated from the preceding". Whereas in Isaiah 3:6 the men "take hold of" (tapas) a man to get a ruler, in this verse the women "take hold of" (chazaq) a man to get a husband. The women supplying their own food and apparel is a reversal of the marriage ordering in Exodus 21:10.

== Zion's renewal (4:2–6) ==
=== Verse 2 ===
In that day the Branch of the Lord shall be beautiful and glorious;

And the fruit of the earth shall be excellent and appealing

For those of Israel who have escaped.

The text in the Septuagint is different:

In that day, God shall shine in counsel with glory upon the earth, to exalt, and to glorify the remnant of Israel.

== See also ==
- Mount Zion
- Related Bible parts: Isaiah 3, Isaiah 11, Isaiah 53, Jeremiah 23, Jeremiah 33, Zechariah 3, Zechariah 9, Luke 1, Romans 11, Revelation 22

== Bibliography ==
- Coggins, R (2007). "22. Isaiah". In Barton, John; Muddiman, John (eds.). The Oxford Bible Commentary (first (paperback) ed.). Oxford University Press. pp. 433–586. ISBN 978-0199277186.
- Motyer, J. Alec (2015). The Prophecy of Isaiah: An Introduction & Commentary. InterVarsity Press. ISBN 9780830895243.
- Ulrich, Eugene, ed. (2010). The Biblical Qumran Scrolls: Transcriptions and Textual Variants. Brill.
- Würthwein, Ernst (1995). The Text of the Old Testament. Translated by Rhodes, Erroll F. Grand Rapids, MI: Wm. B. Eerdmans. ISBN 0-8028-0788-7.
