= Isaiah 12 =

Book of Isaiah, chapter 12

- ← chapter 11 chapter 13 →
- The Great Isaiah Scroll, the best preserved of the biblical scrolls found at Qumran from the second century BC, contains all the verses in this chapter.
- Book: Book of Isaiah
- Hebrew Bible part: Nevi'im
- Order in the Hebrew part: 5
- Category: Latter Prophets
- Christian Bible part: Old Testament
- Order in the Christian part: 23

Isaiah 12 is the twelfth chapter of the Book of Isaiah in the Hebrew Bible or the Old Testament of the Christian Bible. This book contains the prophecies attributed to the prophet Isaiah, and is one of the Books of the Prophets. The Cambridge Bible for Schools and Colleges describes this chapter as "the lyrical epilogue to the first great division of the book (chapters 1–12)".

== Text ==
The original text was written in Hebrew language. This chapter is divided into 6 verses and consists of two short hymns of praise. Protestant theologian Heinrich Ewald argued in 1840 that these songs contain little of the distinctive language used elsewhere by Isaiah, and were probably a later addition to the book; by the end of the nineteenth century his opinion had "slowly won a wide acceptance among scholars".

=== Textual witnesses ===
Some early manuscripts containing the text of this chapter in Hebrew are of the Masoretic Text tradition, which includes the Codex Cairensis (895), the Petersburg Codex of the Prophets (916), Aleppo Codex (10th century), Codex Leningradensis (1008).

Fragments containing parts of this chapter were found among the Dead Sea Scrolls (3rd century BC or later):

- 1QIsa^{a}: complete
- 1QIsa^{b}: extant: verses 3‑4, 6
- 4QIsa^{a} (4Q55): extant: verses 4‑6
- 4QIsa^{b} (4Q56): extant: verses 2
- 4QIsa^{c} (4Q57): extant: verses 1
- 4QIsa^{l} (4Q65): extant: verses 1‑4, 6

There is also a translation into Koine Greek known as the Septuagint, made in the last few centuries BCE. Extant ancient manuscripts of the Septuagint version include Codex Vaticanus (B; $\mathfrak{G}$^{B}; 4th century), Codex Sinaiticus (S; BHK: $\mathfrak{G}$^{S}; 4th century), Codex Alexandrinus (A; $\mathfrak{G}$^{A}; 5th century) and Codex Marchalianus (Q; $\mathfrak{G}$^{Q}; 6th century).

== Parashot ==
The parashah sections listed here are based on the Aleppo Codex. Isaiah 12 is a part of the Prophecies about Judah and Israel (Isaiah 1–12). {P}: open parashah; {S}: closed parashah.

[{P} 11:11-16] 12:1-6 {S}

== Verse 2 ==
Behold, God is my salvation,

I will trust and not be afraid;

‘For Yah, the Lord, is my strength and song;

He also has become my salvation.’

Hebrew (Masoretic text)

הנה אל ישועתי אבטח ולא אפחד כי־עזי וזמרת יה יהוה ויהי־לי לישועה׃

Transliteration:

hi·neh EL ye·shu·'a·ti eb·takh we·lo eph·khad

ki-a·zi we·zim·rat YAH YHWH way·hi-li li·shu·'ah.

- "Yah, the Lord" (יה יהוה, Y(a)H Y(e)H(o)W(a)H) the repetition of God's holy name emphasizes that the salvation of Israel does not come from other nations but only from God, who always keeps His covenant with the people of Israel.

== Canticle ==
In medieval times, the chapter was used in Christian worship as a canticle for morning prayer, known as the Song of Isaiah or Confitebor tibi, Domine, quoniam iratus es mihi (I will give thanks to you, O Lord, for you were angry with me). In the Episcopal Book of Common Prayer it is known as the First Song of Isaiah.

== See also ==
- Crossing the Red Sea
- Hallel
- Song of the sea
- YHWH
- Zion
- Related Bible parts: Exodus 15, Psalm 34, Psalm 118, Psalm 145

== Bibliography ==
- Würthwein, Ernst (1995). The Text of the Old Testament. Translated by Rhodes, Erroll F. Grand Rapids, MI: Wm. B. Eerdmans. ISBN 0-8028-0788-7.
