= Isaiah 11 =

Book of Isaiah, chapter 11

- ← chapter 10 chapter 12 →
- The Great Isaiah Scroll, the best preserved of the biblical scrolls found at Qumran from the second century BC, contains all the verses in this chapter.
- Book: Book of Isaiah
- Hebrew Bible part: Nevi'im
- Order in the Hebrew part: 5
- Category: Latter Prophets
- Christian Bible part: Old Testament
- Order in the Christian part: 23

Isaiah 11 is the eleventh chapter of the Book of Isaiah in the Hebrew Bible or the Old Testament of the Christian Bible. This book contains prophesies attributed to the prophet Isaiah. Isaiah 11 is a part of the Prophecies about Judah and Israel (Isaiah 1–12). The Jerusalem Bible refers to Isaiah 6-12 as Isaiah's Book of Immanuel.

The Old Testament scholar Brevard Childs divides this chapter into two main parts, verses 1–9 and verses 11–16, with verse 10 acting as a connecting statement between them. The New International Version entitles the chapter "The Branch from Jesse".

== Text ==
The original text was written in Hebrew language. This chapter is divided into 16 verses.

=== Textual witnesses ===
Some early manuscripts containing the text of this chapter in Hebrew are of the Masoretic Text, which includes the Codex Cairensis (895), the Petersburg Codex of the Prophets (916), Aleppo Codex (10th century), and Codex Leningradensis (1008).

Some fragments containing parts of this chapter were found among the Dead Sea Scrolls (2nd century BC or later):

- 1QIsa^{a}: complete
- 4QIsa^{a} (4Q55): extant verses 12–15
- 4QIsa^{b} (4Q56): extant verses 7–9
- 4QIsa^{c} (4Q57): extant verses 4–11
- 4QIsa^{l} (4Q65): extant verses 14–15

There is also a translation into Koine Greek known as the Septuagint, made in the last few centuries BCE. Extant ancient manuscripts of the Septuagint version include the Codex Vaticanus (B; $\mathfrak{G}$^{B}; 4th century), Codex Sinaiticus (S; BHK: $\mathfrak{G}$^{S}; 4th century), Codex Alexandrinus (A; $\mathfrak{G}$^{A}; 5th century) and Codex Marchalianus (Q; $\mathfrak{G}$^{Q}; 6th century).

== Parashot ==
The parashah sections listed here are based on the Aleppo Codex, as reflected in the Jewish Publication Society's 1917 edition of the Hebrew Bible in English:

{S} 11:1-9 {S} 11:10 {P} 11:11-16 [12:1-6 {S}]

{P}: open parashah; {S}: closed parashah.

== The righteous reign of the Branch (verses 1–9) ==
This section deals with the unbroken continuity between the house of David and the coming messianic king, although the Davidic dynasty was "cut off to only a stump" because of its pride and corruption.

=== Verse 1 ===
And there shall come forth a rod out of the stem of Jesse,
and a Branch shall grow out of his roots:

See also: Verse 10

Jesse was the father of King David (1 Samuel 16:1–20).

- "Rod" (חטר khoṭır; also in Proverbs 14:3: or "branch" (צמח tsemach) in Isaiah 4:2 (a twig, a shoot); these words "are messianic terms."
- The naming of Jesse assures the continuity of the messianic line, but serves as a reminder of David's humble beginnings and divine election rather than on royal pretension and human pride (2 Samuel 7).
- "Branch" - (נצר nêtser). A twig, branch, sprout or shoot; a word of "messianic terms". The word occurs four times in the Hebrew Bible including this verse. (Note: The other three are Isaiah 60:21 : 'They shall inherit the land forever, the branch of my planting;' Isaiah 14:19: 'But thou art cast out of thy grave as an abominable branch' (KJV); Daniel 11:7: 'But out of a branch of her roots shall one stand up in his estate.') There is another word rendered "branch" (צמח tsemach) in Jeremiah 23:5; Jeremiah 33:15, although it means substantially the same thing. The word "branch" is also used in rendering several other Hebrew words, but here the word is synonymous with that which is rendered "rod" in the previous part of the verse - a shoot, or twig, from the root of a decayed tree. The word "netser" or "netzer" is the name of the city of Nazareth, which perhaps was so called because of the trees, plants, and grass which grew there. Jesus Christ's dwelling in this city fulfilled a prophecy, that he should be called a "Nazarene"; or an inhabitant of Netzer (Matthew 2:23). The Jews speak of one Ben Netzer, who they say was a robber, took cities, and reigned over them, and became the head of robbers; and make him to be the little horn in Daniel 7:8, which some implied that he was Jesus; at the same time it tacitly acknowledges that Jesus of Nazareth is the "Netzer" this prophecy speaks of, but in a negative way, that he should be as "a root out of a dry ground" (Isaiah 53:2) or as "a rod and branch out of a dry root".
- "Roots": from a decayed tree where a shoot starts up. The Septuagint renders this, 'And a flower (ἄνθος anthos) shall arise from the root'. Chaldee version states 'And a king shall proceed from the sons of Jesse, and the Messiah from his sons' sons shall arise', showing conclusively that the ancient Jews referred this to the Messiah. In the Book of Revelation it is applied to Jesus Christ (Revelation 22:16).

=== Verses 3–4 ===
^{3} And his delight shall be in the fear of the Lord.
He shall not judge by what his eyes see,
or decide disputes by what his ears hear,
^{4} but with righteousness he shall judge the poor,
and decide with equity for the meek of the earth;
and he shall strike the earth with the rod of his mouth,
and with the breath of his lips he shall kill the wicked.

- "And his delight shall be in the fear of the Lord" (English Standard Version): or "and shall make him of quick understanding in the fear of the Lord" (King James Version), translated from Hebrew: והריחו ביראת יהוה, wa-hă-rî-khōw bə-yir-’aṯ Yah-weh.

=== Verse 6 ===
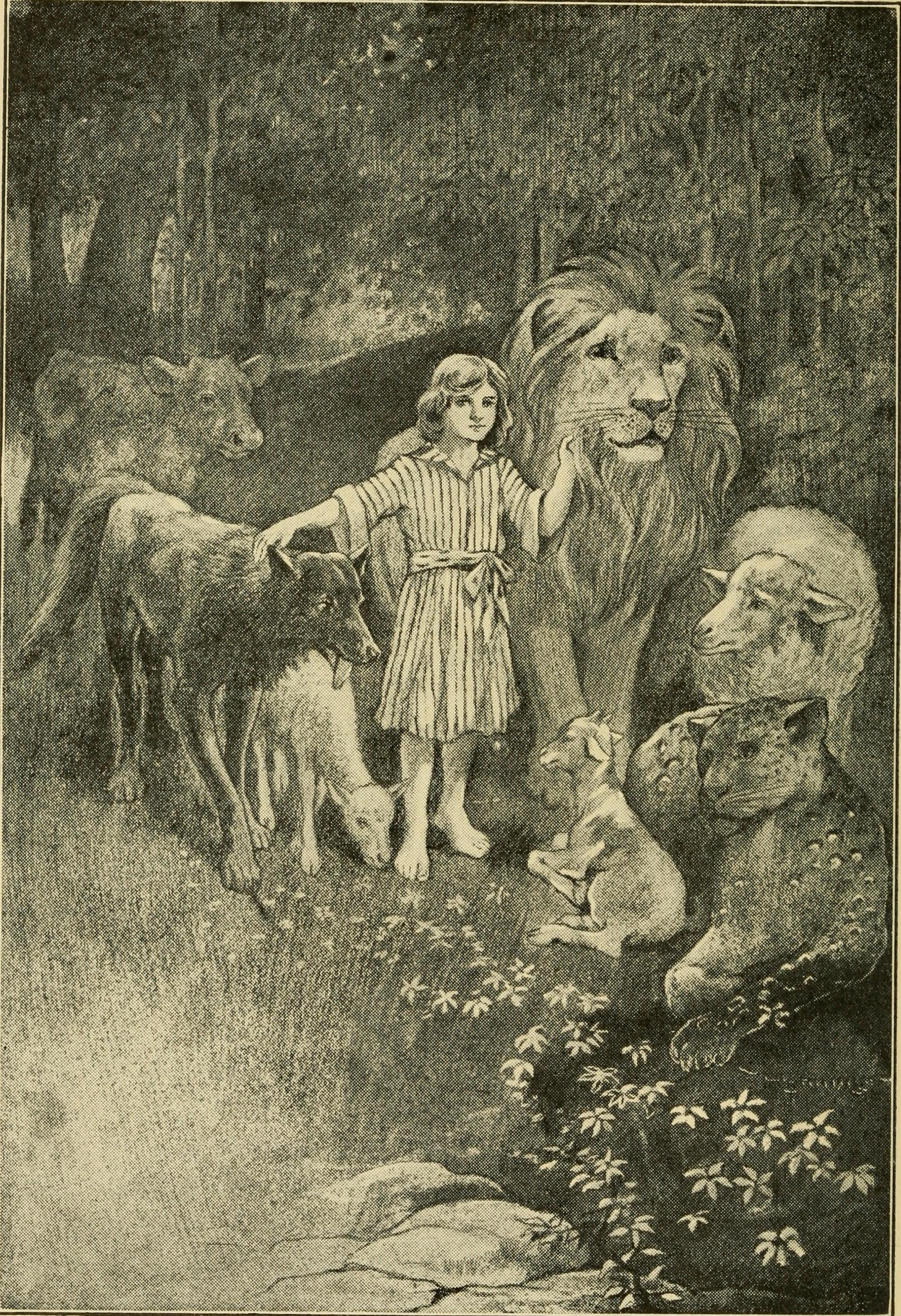
"A world in perplexity" by Arthur Grosvenor Daniells (1918).

The wolf also shall dwell with the lamb,
The leopard shall lie down with the young goat,
The calf and the young lion and the fatling together;
And a little child shall lead them.

- Cross reference: Isaiah 65:25

This verse and subsequent verses until verse 9 describe the peace of the Messiah's kingdom, which is also described in the Targum: "in the days of the Messiah of Israel, peace shall be multiplied in the earth" and referred to the times of the Messiah in various Jewish literature, such as in Tzeror Hammor and Maimonides when the Israelites will dwell safely among "the wicked of the nations of the world" (comparable to "the wild beasts of the field").

- "A little child": Bohlius interprets this with Jesus Christ (cf. Isaiah 9:6) in particular observes, that they are not to be understood literally, as if the custom and order of things in the world would cease, or that things would be renewed as at the creation, but in a parabolical and enigmatical sense; and interprets them of.

=== Verse 9 ===
They shall not hurt nor destroy in all my holy mountain: for the earth shall be full of the knowledge of the Lord, as the waters cover the sea.

The message in this verse is echoed in chapter 65.

== Israel is reclaimed and reunited (verses 10–16) ==
=== Verse 10 ===
^{(a)}And in that day there shall be a Root of Jesse,
Who shall stand as a banner to the people;
^{(b)}For the Gentiles shall seek Him,
And His resting place shall be glorious.

- Cross reference: (a) Isaiah 11:1
  (b) Isaiah 2:3; Isaiah 43:6; Isaiah 49:22; Isaiah 60:3; Isaiah 66:12
- Cited by Apostle Paul in Romans 15:12
- "Root of Jesse": a sprout, shoot, or scion of the family of Jesse (cf. Isaiah 5:1). This particular "root" (Hebrew: שׁרשׁ, shoresh) is still alive when the tree is dead, that it can send up a shoot or sprout; it is thus applied to him who should come out of the ancient and decayed family of Jesse (cf. Isaiah 53:2). In Revelation 5:5, the Messiah is called "the root of David," and in Revelation 22:16, "the root and the offspring of David".

=== Verses 11–16 ===
This section contains an eschatological prophecy (starting with "in that day") about the restoration of Israel's remnant who were scattered to the ends of the earth.

Isaiah 11:12 references "the four corners of the earth." (NRSVue), which Hebrew Bible scholar Dr. Kyle Greenwood sees, not as literal squared edges, but instead as an idiom to the four cardinal directions, like seen on a compass. This expression also appears in Ezekiel 7, Revelation 7:1 and Revelation 20:8.

== See also ==
- Ammon
- Assyria
- Christian messianic prophecies
- Christianity and Judaism
- Cush
- Edom
- Egypt
- Elam
- Ephraim
- Ethiopia
- Euphrates
- Hamath
- INRI
- Jesse
- Jewish messianism
- Judah
- Messianic prophecies of Jesus
- Moab
- Old Testament messianic prophecies quoted in the New Testament
- Pathros
- Philistines
- Shinar
- Tree of Jesse
- Related Bible parts: Isaiah 4, Isaiah 6, Isaiah 9, Isaiah 53, Jeremiah 23, Zechariah 3, Zechariah 6, Matthew 2, Romans 5, Romans 15, Revelation 5, Revelation 22

== General and cited references ==
- Childs, Brevard S. (2001). Isaiah. The Old Testament library. Westminster John Knox Press. ISBN 9780664221430.
- Coggins, R (2007). "22. Isaiah". In Barton, John; Muddiman, John (eds.). The Oxford Bible Commentary (first (paperback) ed.). Oxford University Press. pp. 433–486. ISBN 978-0199277186.
- Coogan, Michael David (2007). Coogan, Michael David; Brettler, Marc Zvi; Newsom, Carol Ann; Perkins, Pheme (eds.). The New Oxford Annotated Bible with the Apocryphal/Deuterocanonical Books: New Revised Standard Version, Issue 48 (Augmented 3rd ed.). Oxford University Press. ISBN 9780195288810.
- Ulrich, Eugene, ed. (2010). The Biblical Qumran Scrolls: Transcriptions and Textual Variants. Brill.
- Würthwein, Ernst (1995). The Text of the Old Testament. Translated by Rhodes, Erroll F. Grand Rapids, MI: Wm. B. Eerdmans. ISBN 0-8028-0788-7.
