= Zechariah 8 =

Bible chapter

- ← chapter 7 chapter 9 →
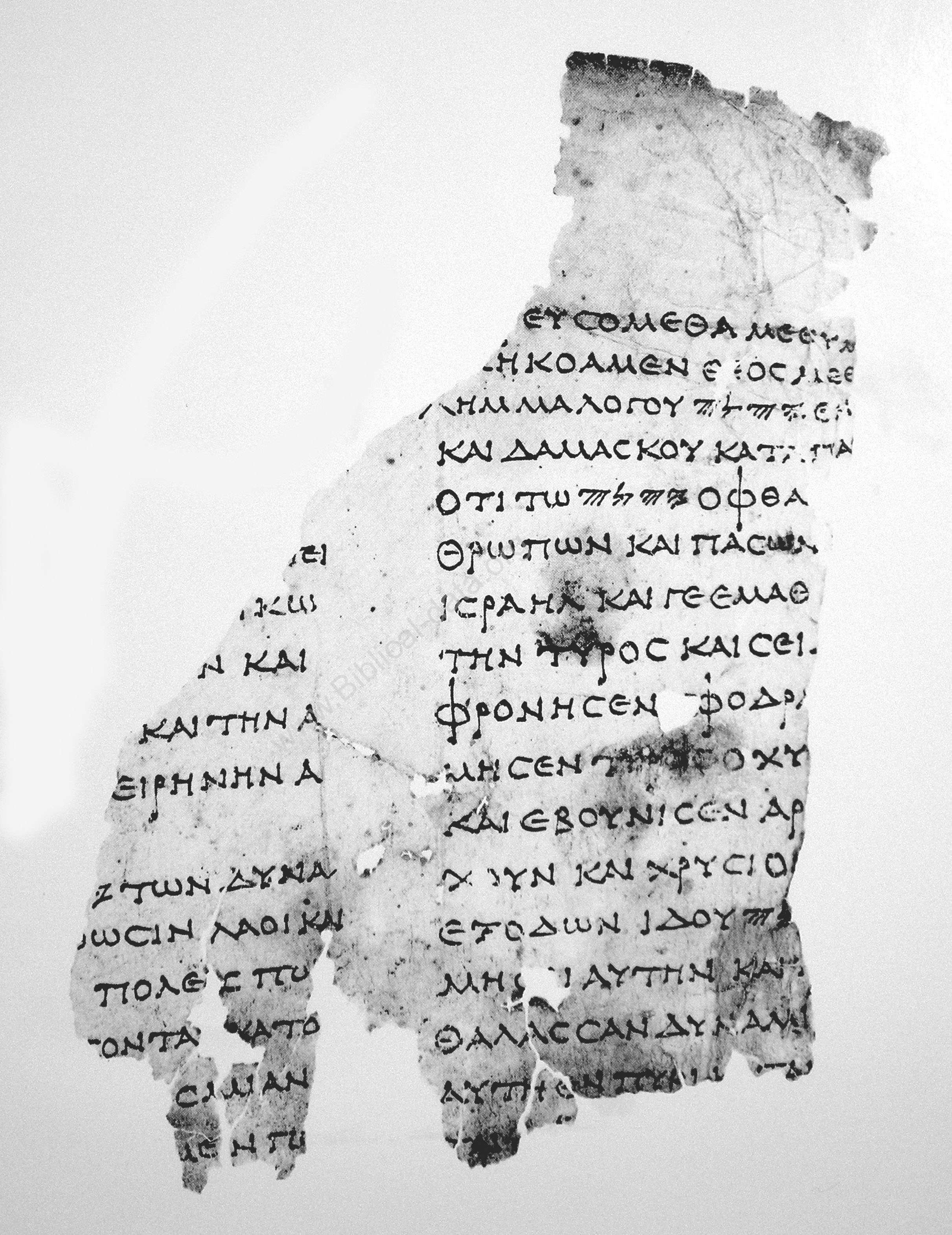
- Columns B1–2 of the Greek Minor Prophets Scroll from Nahal Hever (8HevXII gr) - circa 50 B.C. to A.D. 50; text is Zechariah 8:18–9:7.
- Book: Book of Zechariah
- Category: Nevi'im
- Christian Bible part: Old Testament
- Order in the Christian part: 38

Zechariah 8 is the eighth of the 14 chapters in the Book of Zechariah in the Hebrew Bible or the Old Testament of the Christian Bible. This book contains the prophecies attributed to the prophet Zechariah. In the Hebrew Bible it is part of the Book of the Twelve Minor Prophets. This chapter concludes the so-called "First Zechariah", consisting of Zechariah 1–8, and brings together ten "short independent oracles", each referring to the word of "the Lord of Hosts".

== Text ==
The original text was written in the Hebrew language. This chapter is divided into 23 verses.

=== Textual witnesses ===
Some early manuscripts containing the text of this chapter in Hebrew are of the Masoretic Text, which includes the Codex Cairensis (from year 895), the Petersburg Codex of the Prophets (916), and Codex Leningradensis (1008). (Note: The Aleppo Codex (930) now only contains Zechariah 9:17b–14:21.) Fragments containing parts of this chapter were found among the Dead Sea Scrolls, that is, 4Q80 (4QXII^{e}; 75–50 BCE) with extant verses 2–4, 6–7.

There is also a translation into Koine Greek known as the Septuagint, made in the last few centuries BCE. Extant ancient manuscripts of the Septuagint version include Codex Vaticanus (B; $\mathfrak{G}$^{B}; 4th century), Codex Sinaiticus (S; BHK: $\mathfrak{G}$^{S}; 4th century), Codex Alexandrinus (A; $\mathfrak{G}$^{A}; 5th century) and Codex Marchalianus (Q; $\mathfrak{G}$^{Q}; 6th century). Some fragments containing parts of this chapter (a revision of the Septuagint) were found among the Dead Sea Scrolls, i.e., Naḥal Ḥever 8Ḥev1 (8ḤevXII^{gr}); late 1st century BCE) with extant verses 19–21, 23.

== Contents ==
Verses 1-8 return to a theme of renewal, revisiting Zechariah 1:14-17: the Lord of Hosts' zeal or jealousy for Jerusalem and Zion, foreseen in Zechariah 1, reappears in Zechariah 8:2. Biblical translations which refer to "zeal" in Zechariah 1:14 use the same word in Zechariah 8:2 (see for example the New King James Version and the footnotes for both verses), while translations which prefer to use "jealous" and "jealousy", such as the New International Version, do so in both chapters.

Verses 9-13 return to the theme of temple building (cf. Haggai 2:15–19).

=== Verse 7 ===
Thus saith the Lord of hosts;

Behold, I will save my people

from the east country,
and from the west country;

"From … east … west" engages every region of the world (cf. Psalm 50:1) where the people of Israel had been scattered: to the east, under Nebuchadnezzar, mainly to Babylonia, and to the "west", literally, "the going down of the sun" (Malachi 1:11), especially countries west of Jerusalem. The restoration of the people includes a spiritual return to God (Zechariah 8:8) in the future (Isaiah 11:11, 12; 43:5, 6; Ezekiel 37:21; Amos 9:14, 15; also Zechariah 13:9; Jeremiah 30:22; 31:1, 33); also Romans 11:26 (or a similar promise, John 11:52).

=== Verse 8 ===
And I will bring them,

and they shall dwell in the middle of Jerusalem:

and they shall be my people,

and I will be their God,

in truth and in righteousness.

- "And they shall be My people": God promises to those who were already His people, as Jeremiah says, "I will give them an heart to know Me, that I am the Lord, and they shall be My people, and I will be their God: for they shall return unto Me with their whole heart" (Jeremiah 24:7; cf. Jeremiah 30:22), and, "This shall be the covenant that I will make with the house of Israel; After those days, saith the Lord, I will put My law in their inward parts, and will write it in their hearts; and will be their God, and they shall be My people" (Jeremiah 31:33).
- "and they shall dwell in the midst of Jerusalem": referring to 'the household of God', with 'no more foreigners and strangers'.

=== Verse 12 ===
For the seed shall be prosperous; the vine shall give her fruit, and the ground shall give her increase, and the heavens shall give their dew; and I will cause the remnant of this people to possess all these things.

- "The seed shall be prosperous": translated from Hebrew זרע השלום, zera‘ ha-shālōm, literally, "the seed of peace", denoting that the crops sown shall be crops of peace and secure". The Septuagint reads "But I will show forth peace", whereas the Syriac version reads "The seed shall be safe". The consecutive words "For the seed shall be prosperous; the vine shall give her fruit" can also be rendered as "For the seed of peace, the vine, shall give its fruit".

=== Expectations for Jerusalem (verses 14–17) ===
The central message of these verses is the expectation of YHWH that in view of the restoration (8:1–8) and promised prosperity (8:9–13), Jerusalem must live according to her renewed status as covenant people.

=== Pilgrimage to Jerusalem (verses 18–23) ===
This final part of the oracle in Zechariah 7–8 returns to the beginning theme of "fasting", arranged as a 'bracketing device' with 7:1–7, as indicated in some clues:

- Pilgrimage to Jerusalem: by the Bethelites (7:2–3) then by the peoples of the nations (8:20–21) in order " to beseech the favor of YHWH" (7:2; 8:21)
- Representatives sent: by a single city (7:2) and by "all languages of the nations" (8:23)
- Fasting in sorrow (7:3) will be replaced by 'feasting for joy' (8:19).

=== Verse 19 ===
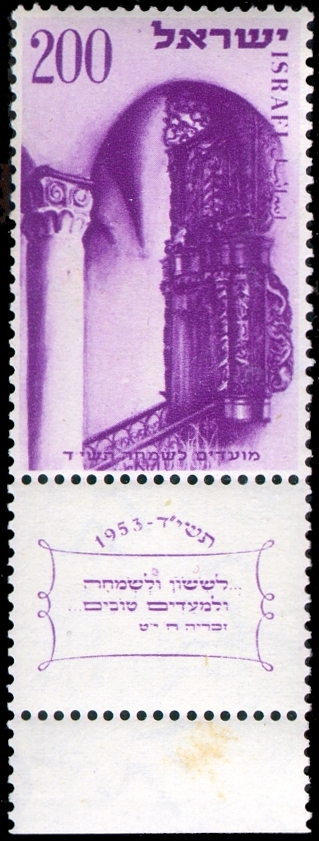
200 mil stamp. Holy Arks in a synagogue in Safed.

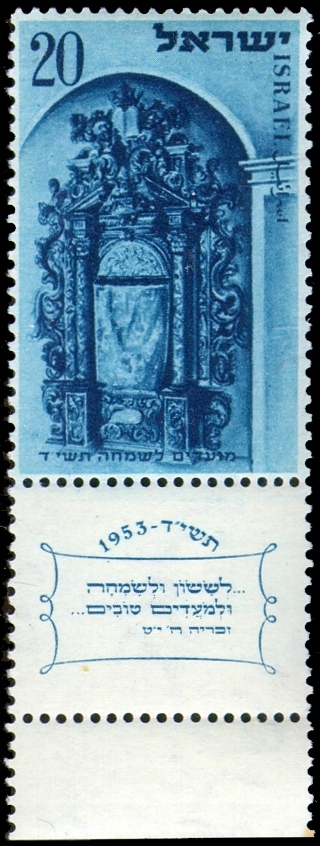
20 mil stamp. Holy Arks in a synagogue in Jerusalem

Joyous Festivals 5714 stamps of Israel. Inscription on tab: "...Joy and gladness, and cheerful feasts" Zechariah 8:19.

Thus saith the Lord of hosts;

The fast of the fourth month,
and the fast of the fifth,
and the fast of the seventh,
and the fast of the tenth,

shall be to the house of Judah

joy and gladness, and cheerful feasts;

therefore love the truth and peace.

- "The fast of the fourth month": Jerome gives the later Jewish traditions concerning the fastings. The fast of the seventeenth day of the fourth month commemorated the breaking of the two tables of the commandments by Moses, as well as the first breach in the walls of Jerusalem; On the ninth day "of the fourth month" of Zedekiah's eleventh year, Jerusalem, in the extremity of famine, opened to Nebuchadnezzar, and his princes sat in her gate; Jerusalem was taken (Jeremiah 39:2; 52:6, 7). It was therefore made a fast day.
- "The fast of the fifth": This fast on the ninth of Av (Tisha B'Av), the fifth month, had been established in memory of the destruction of Jerusalem by Nebuchadnezzar. The temple was burnt on the ninth or tenth of the month (see 2 Kings 25:8, 9; Jeremiah 52:12, 13). Jerome wrote that the fast of the fifth month was observed in memory of the return of the spies sent to explore Canaan, and the consequent punishment of forty years' wandering in the wilderness, as well as of the burning of the temple by the Chaldeans.
- "The fast of the seventh", the fast of Gedaliah, (also in Zechariah 7:5): This fast was in memory of the murder of Gedaliah and those with him at Mizpah, issuing in the dispersion of the Jews (2 Kings 25:25, 26; Jeremiah 41:1-3).
- "The fast of the tenth": On the tenth of Tevet, the tenth month, in the ninth year of Zedekiah, the siege began (Jeremiah 52:4). Jerome states that the fast of the tenth month was appointed because it was then that Ezekiel and the captive Jews received intelligence of the complete destruction of the temple.

=== Verse 23 ===
Thus saith the Lord of hosts;
In those days it shall come to pass,
that ten men shall take hold out of all languages of the nations,

even shall take hold of the skirt of him that is a Jew, saying,

We will go with you:
for we have heard that God is with you.

- "Ten men": The number ten is usually used for a large indefinite number (cf. Genesis 31:7; Leviticus 26:26; 1 Samuel 1:8). It is also the number of men required to form a synagogue in Jewish tradition.
- "Of all languages of the nations": The day of Pentecost was to be the reversal of the confusion of Babel; all were to have one voice, as God had said, "It (the time) shall come to gather all nations and tongues, and they shall come and see My glory" (Isaiah 66:18).
- "They shall lay hold of the skirt of one man who is a Jew": Jerome interpret this "one man, a Jew" as Jesus Christ, connecting it with the prophecy: "A prince shall not depart from Judah, nor a lawgiver from between his feet, until He shall come, for whom it is laid up, and for Him shall the Gentiles wait" (Genesis 49:8-10) and "there shall be a rod of Jesse, and He who shall arise to rule over the Gentiles, to Him shall the Gentiles seek" (Isaiah 11:10), for it was essential to the fulfillment of God's promises. The Christ was to be "the Son of David" Matthew 1:1; Matthew 22:42. "Hath not the Scripture said, That Christ cometh of the seed of David, and out of the linen of Bethlehem, where David was?" (John 7:42). David, "being a prophet and knowing that God had sworn with an oath to him, that of the fruit of his loins according to the flesh, He would raise up Christ to sit on his throne Acts 2:30; "Of this man's seed hath God, according to promise, raised unto Israel a Savior, Jesus" (Acts 13:23). Paul also begins his great doctrinal Epistle with this contrast, "the Gospel of God concerning His Son Jesus Christ, which was made of the seed of David according to the flesh, and declared to be the Son of God with power" (Romans 1:1-4). He was that "one Man among a thousand, whom Solomon says, I found; but a woman among all those have I not found" (Ecclesiastes 7:28); the one in the whole human race. It was fulfilled when "they brought to Him all that were diseased, and besought Him that they might only touch the hem of His garment: and as many as touched were made perfectly whole" (Matthew 14:35-36). "The whole multitude sought to touch Him, for there went virtue out of Him and healed all" (Luke 6:19, add Luke 8:46; Mark 5:30).

== See also ==
- Fast of Gedalia
- Hebrew calendar: Tammuz (4th month) Ab (5th month), Tishrei (7th month), Tevet (10th month)
- Jerusalem
- Seventeenth of Tammuz
- Tenth of Tevet
- Tisha B'Av
- Yom Kippur (Day of Atonement)
- Related Bible parts: Isaiah 43, Ephesians 4

== Sources ==
- Boda, Mark J. (2016). Harrison, R. K.; Hubbard, Jr, Robert L. (eds.). The Book of Zechariah. New International Commentary on the Old Testament. Wm. B. Eerdmans Publishing. ISBN 978-0802823755.
- Collins, John J. (2014). Introduction to the Hebrew Scriptures. Fortress Press. ISBN 9781451469233.
- Coogan, Michael David (2007). Coogan, Michael David; Brettler, Marc Zvi; Newsom, Carol Ann; Perkins, Pheme (eds.). The New Oxford Annotated Bible with the Apocryphal/Deuterocanonical Books: New Revised Standard Version, Issue 48 (Augmented 3rd ed.). Oxford University Press. ISBN 9780195288810.
- Fitzmyer, Joseph A. (2008). A Guide to the Dead Sea Scrolls and Related Literature. Grand Rapids, MI: William B. Eerdmans Publishing Company. ISBN 9780802862419.
- Hayes, Christine (2015). Introduction to the Bible. Yale University Press. ISBN 978-0300188271.
- Larkin, Katrina J. A. (2007). "37. Zechariah". In Barton, John; Muddiman, John (eds.). The Oxford Bible Commentary (first (paperback) ed.). Oxford University Press. pp. 610–615. ISBN 978-0199277186.
- Mason, Rex (1993). "Zechariah, The Book of.". In Metzger, Bruce M; Coogan, Michael D (eds.). The Oxford Companion to the Bible. Oxford University Press. ISBN 978-0195046458.
- Merrill, Eugene H. (2003). Haggai, Zechariah, Malachi: An Exegetical Commentary. Biblical Studies Press. ISBN 9780737500172.
- Ulrich, Eugene, ed. (2010). The Biblical Qumran Scrolls: Transcriptions and Textual Variants. Brill.
- Würthwein, Ernst (1995). The Text of the Old Testament. Translated by Rhodes, Erroll F. Grand Rapids, MI: Wm. B. Eerdmans. ISBN 0-8028-0788-7.
