= Book of Haggai =

Book of the Bible

The Book of Haggai (/ˈhæɡaɪ/; Hebrew: ספר חגי, romanized: Sefer Ḥaggay) is a book of the Hebrew Bible or Tanakh, and is the third-to-last of the Twelve Minor Prophets. It is a short book, consisting of only two chapters. The historical setting dates around 520 BC, before the Temple had been rebuilt. The original text was written in Biblical Hebrew.

== Authorship ==
The Book of Haggai is named after the prophet Haggai whose prophecies are recorded in the book. The authorship of the book is uncertain. Some presume that Haggai wrote the book himself but he is repeatedly referred to in the third person which makes it unlikely that he wrote the text: it is more probable that the book was written by a disciple of Haggai who sought to preserve the content of Haggai's spoken prophecies.

There is no biographical information given about the prophet in the Book of Haggai. Haggai's name is derived from the Hebrew verbal root hgg, which means "to make a pilgrimage". W. Sibley Towner suggests that Haggai's name might come "from his single-minded effort to bring about the reconstruction of that destination of ancient Judean pilgrims, the Temple in Jerusalem".

== Date ==
The Book of Haggai records events in 520 BC, some 18 years after Cyrus had conquered Babylon and issued a decree in 538 BC, allowing the captive Judahites to return to Judea. Cyrus saw the restoration of the temple as necessary for the restoration of religious practices and a sense of peoplehood, after the long exile. The precise date of the written text is uncertain but most likely dates to within a generation of Haggai himself. A traditional consensus dates the completion of the text to c. 515 BC. Other scholars consider the book to be completed around 417 BC, arguing that it did not refer to Darius the Great (Darius I), but to Darius II (424-405 BC).

== Early surviving manuscripts ==
Some early manuscripts containing the text of this book in Biblical Hebrew are of the Masoretic Text, which includes the Codex Cairensis (895), the Petersburg Codex of the Prophets (916), and Codex Leningradensis (1008). (Note: Since the anti-Jewish riots in Aleppo in 1947, the whole book has been missing from the Aleppo Codex.) Fragments of the Hebrew text of this book were found among the Dead Sea Scrolls, including 4Q77 (4QXII^{b}; 150–125 BCE) 4Q80 (4QXII^{e}; 75–50 BCE); and Wadi Murabba'at Minor Prophets (Mur88; MurXIIProph; 75-100 CE).

There is also a translation into Koine Greek known as the Septuagint, made in the last few centuries BCE. Extant ancient manuscripts of the Septuagint version include Codex Vaticanus (B; $\mathfrak{G}$^{B}; 4th century), Codex Sinaiticus (S; BHK: $\mathfrak{G}$^{S}; 4th century), Codex Alexandrinus (A; $\mathfrak{G}$^{A}; 5th century) and Codex Marchalianus (Q; $\mathfrak{G}$^{Q}; 6th century).

== Synopsis ==
The Leningrad Codex (AD. 1008) contains the complete Hebrew text of the Book of Haggai.

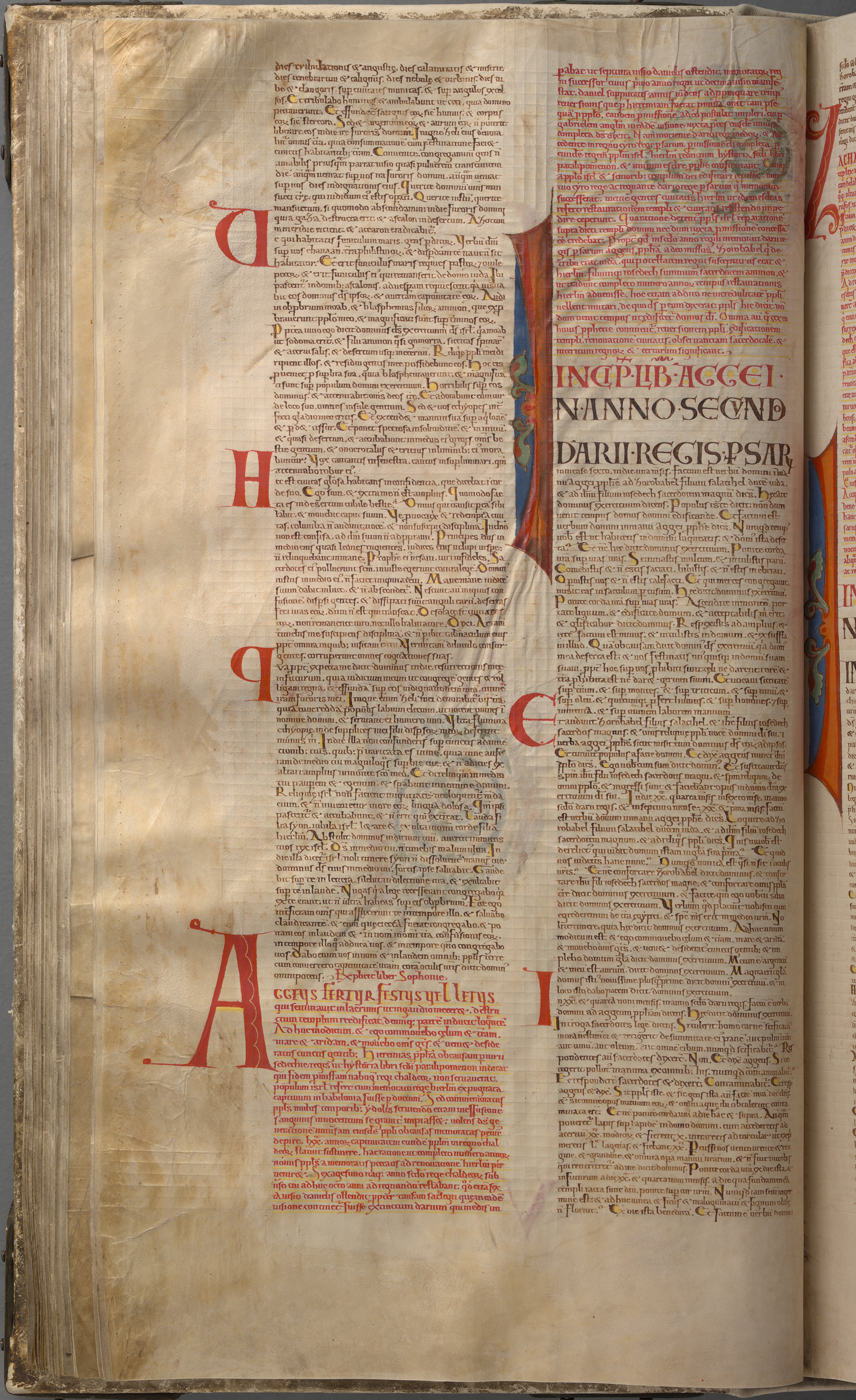
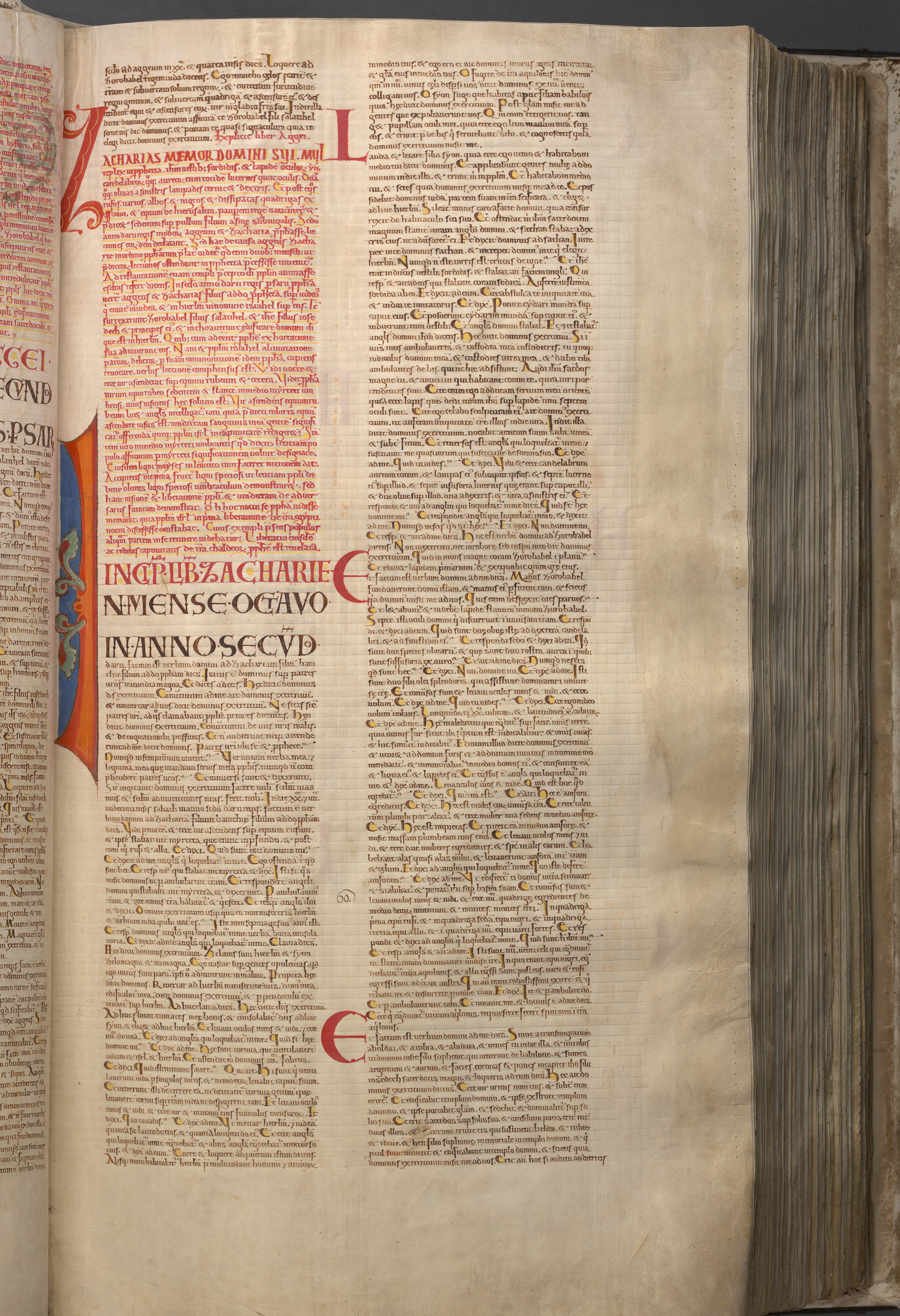
The whole Book of Haggai in Latin as a part of Codex Gigas, made around 13th century.

Haggai's message is filled with an urgency for the people to proceed with the rebuilding of the second Jerusalem temple. Haggai attributes a recent drought to the people's refusal to rebuild the temple, which he sees as key to Jerusalem’s glory. The book ends with the prediction of the downfall of kingdoms, with one Zerubbabel, governor of Judah, as the Lord's chosen leader.

The first chapter contains the first address (2–11) and its effects (12–15). The second chapter contains the second prophecy (1–9), delivered a month after the first; the third prophecy (10–19), delivered two months and three days after the second; and the fourth prophecy (20–23), delivered on the same day as the third.

These discourses are referred to in Ezra 5:1 and 6:14. (Compare Haggai 2:7, 8 and 22)

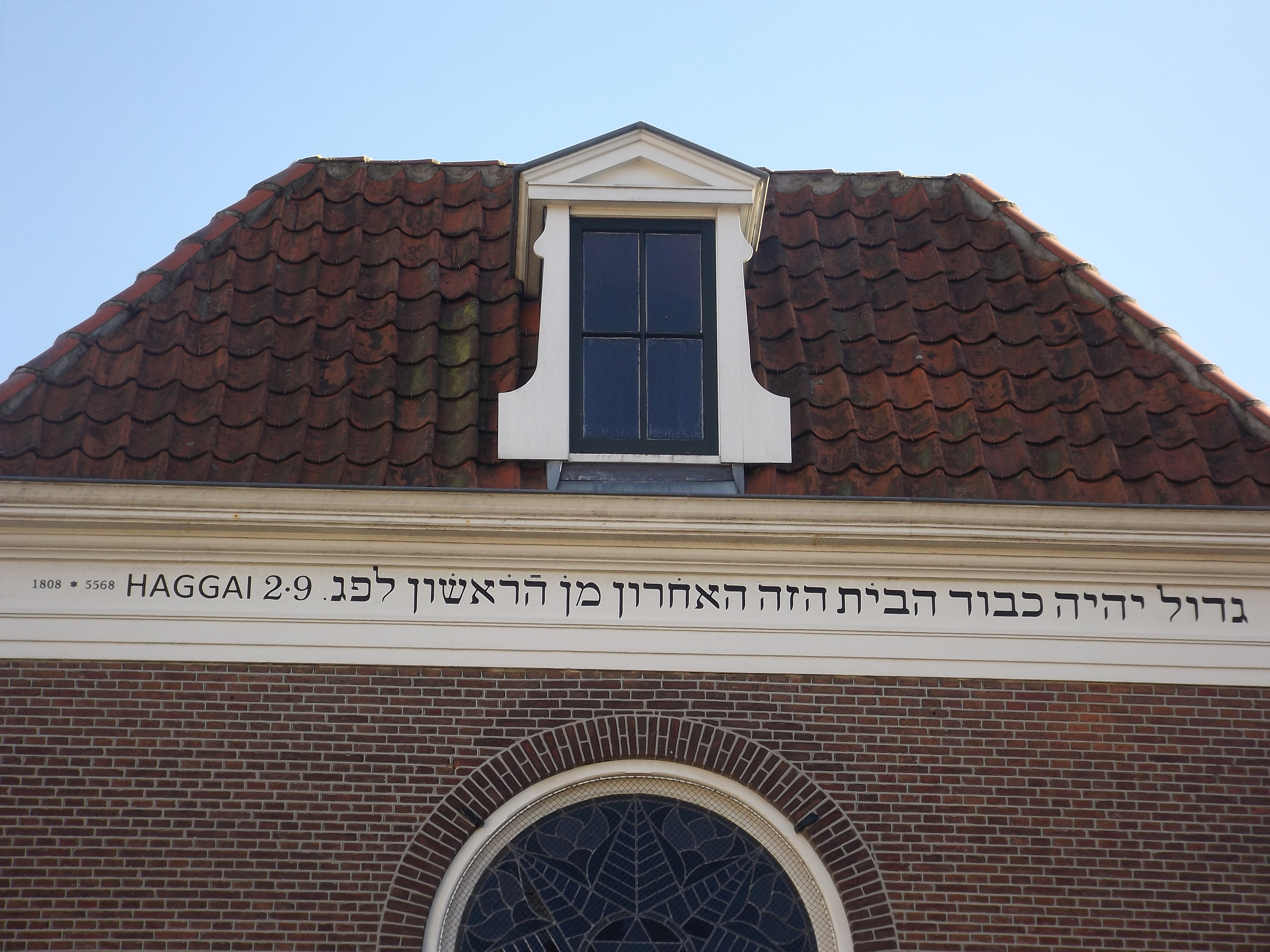
Text from Haggai 2:9 on a synagogue in Alkmaar: "The glory of this present house will be greater than the glory of the former house."

Haggai reports that three weeks after his first prophecy the rebuilding of the Temple began on September 7 521 BC. "They came and began to work on the house of the LORD Almighty, their God, on the twenty-fourth day of the sixth month in the second year of Darius the King." (Haggai 1:14–15) and the Book of Ezra indicates that it was finished on February 25 516 BC "The Temple was completed on the third day of the month Adar, in the sixth year of the reign of King Darius." (Ezra 6:15)

== Musical usage ==
The King James Version of Haggai 2:6–7 is used in the libretto of the English-language oratorio Messiah by George Frideric Handel (HWV 56).

== See also ==
- Darius I
- Joshua the High Priest, son of Jehozadak
- Old Testament messianic prophecies quoted in the New Testament

== Notes ==
Book of Haggai Minor prophets
Preceded by Zephaniah	Hebrew Bible	Succeeded by Zechariah
Preceded by Zephaniah	Christian; Old Testament	Succeeded by Zechariah
