= Book of Zechariah =

Book of the Hebrew Bible

The Book of Zechariah (/ˌzɛk.əˈraɪ.ə/; Biblical Hebrew: זְכַרְיָה, romanized: Zəḵaryāh); also Zachariah or, in the Septuagint and Vulgate, Zacharias (/ˌzæk.əˈraɪ.əs/; Koine Greek: Ζαχαρίας, romanized: Zakharías; Late Latin: Zacharias), is a Jewish text attributed to Zechariah, a Hebrew prophet of the late 6th century BC. In the Hebrew Bible, the text is included as part of the Twelve Minor Prophets, itself a part of the second division of that work. In the Christian Old Testament, the Book of Zechariah is considered to be a separate book and consists of fourteen chapters.

== Historical context ==
One of the three prophets from the post-exilic period, Zechariah's prophecies took place during the reign of Darius the Great. Chapters 1–8 of the book are contemporary with the prophecies of Haggai, while chapters 9–14 (often termed Second Zechariah) are thought to have been written much later—in the 5th century, during the late Persian or early Ptolemaic period. Scholars believe that Ezekiel, with his blending of ceremony and vision, heavily influenced the visionary works of Zechariah 1–8.

During the exile, a significant portion of the population of the Kingdom of Judah was taken to Babylon, where the prophets told them to make their homes, suggesting they would spend a long time there. Cyrus the Great conquered the Neo-Babylonian Empire in 539 BC. The following year, he released the Edict of Cyrus, which marked the beginning of the first return to Judah under Sheshbazzar.

Darius acceded to the throne in 522 BC. He divided the many regions of the empire into provinces, each of which was overseen by a governor. Zerubbabel was appointed by Darius as governor over Judah (now redesignated the province of Yehud Medinata of the Persian Empire). Under the reign of Darius, Zechariah also emerged, focusing his prophecies on the rebuilding of the Temple. Unlike the Babylonians, the Persian Empire went to great lengths to keep cordial relations between vassal and lord. The rebuilding of the Temple was encouraged by the Persian monarchs in hopes that it would stabilize the local population. This policy was good politics on the part of the Persians, and the Jews viewed it as a blessing from God.

== Prophet ==
The name "Zechariah" means "God remembered." Not much is known about Zechariah's life other than what may be inferred from the book. It has been speculated that his grandfather Iddo was the head of a priestly family who returned with Zerubbabel and that Zechariah may have been a priest as well as a prophet. This is supported by Zechariah's interest in the Temple and the priesthood, and from Iddo's preaching in the Books of Chronicles.

== Authorship ==
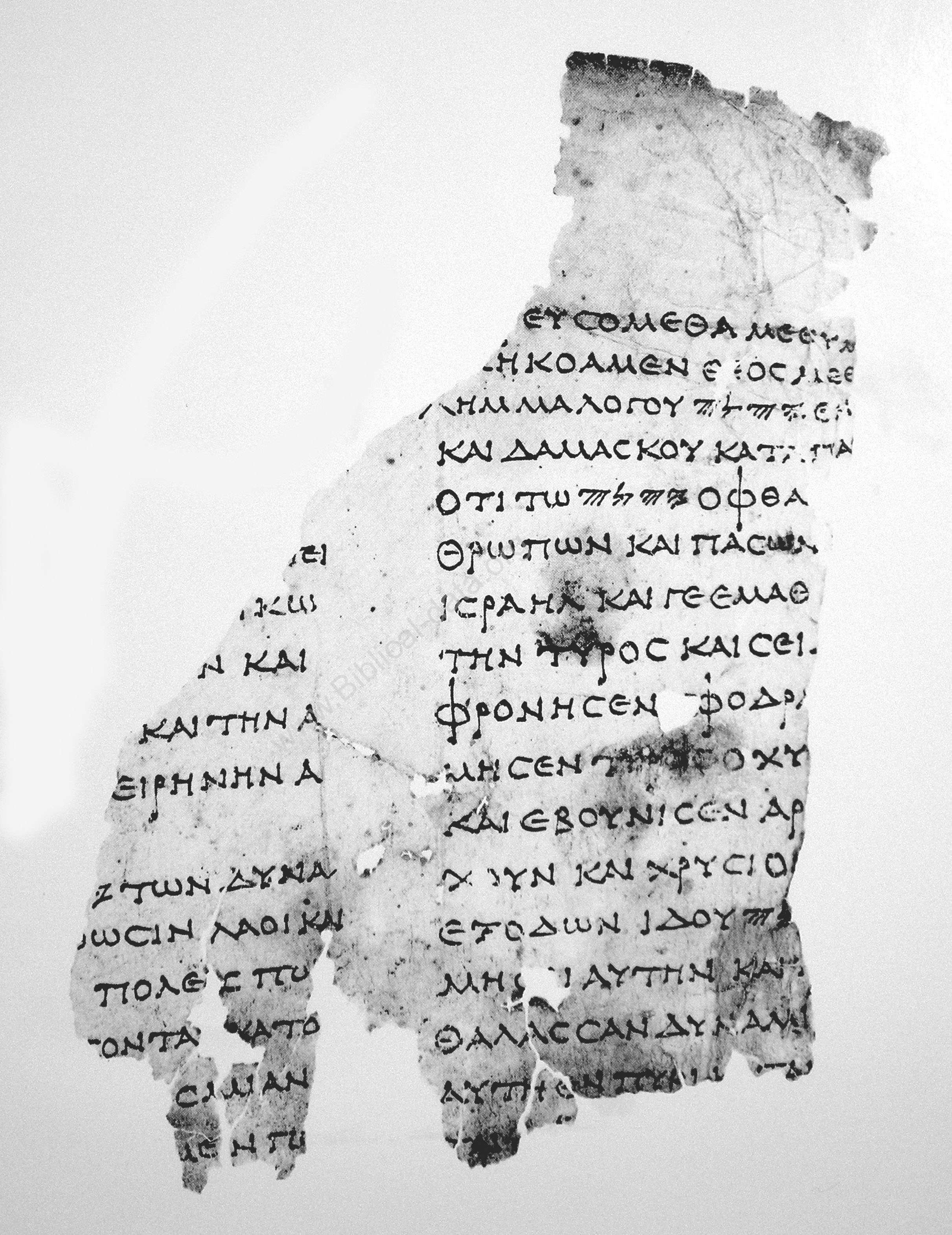
Greek manuscript of Zechariah from c. 50 BCE–50 CE (Nahal Hever)

Most modern scholars believe the Book of Zechariah was written by at least two different people. Zechariah 1–8, sometimes referred to as First Zechariah, was written in the 6th century BC and contains oracles from the historical prophet Zechariah, who lived in the Achaemenid Empire during the kingdom of Darius the Great. Zechariah 9–14, often called Second Zechariah, contains within the text no datable references to specific events or individuals, but most scholars give the text a date in the 5th century BC. Second Zechariah, in the opinion of some scholars, appears to make use of the books of Isaiah, Jeremiah, and Ezekiel, the Deuteronomistic history, and the themes from First Zechariah. This has led some to believe that the writer(s) or editor(s) of Second Zechariah may have been a disciple of the prophet Zechariah. There are some scholars who go even further and divide Second Zechariah into Second Zechariah (9–11) and Third Zechariah (12–14) since each begins with a heading oracle.

== Composition ==
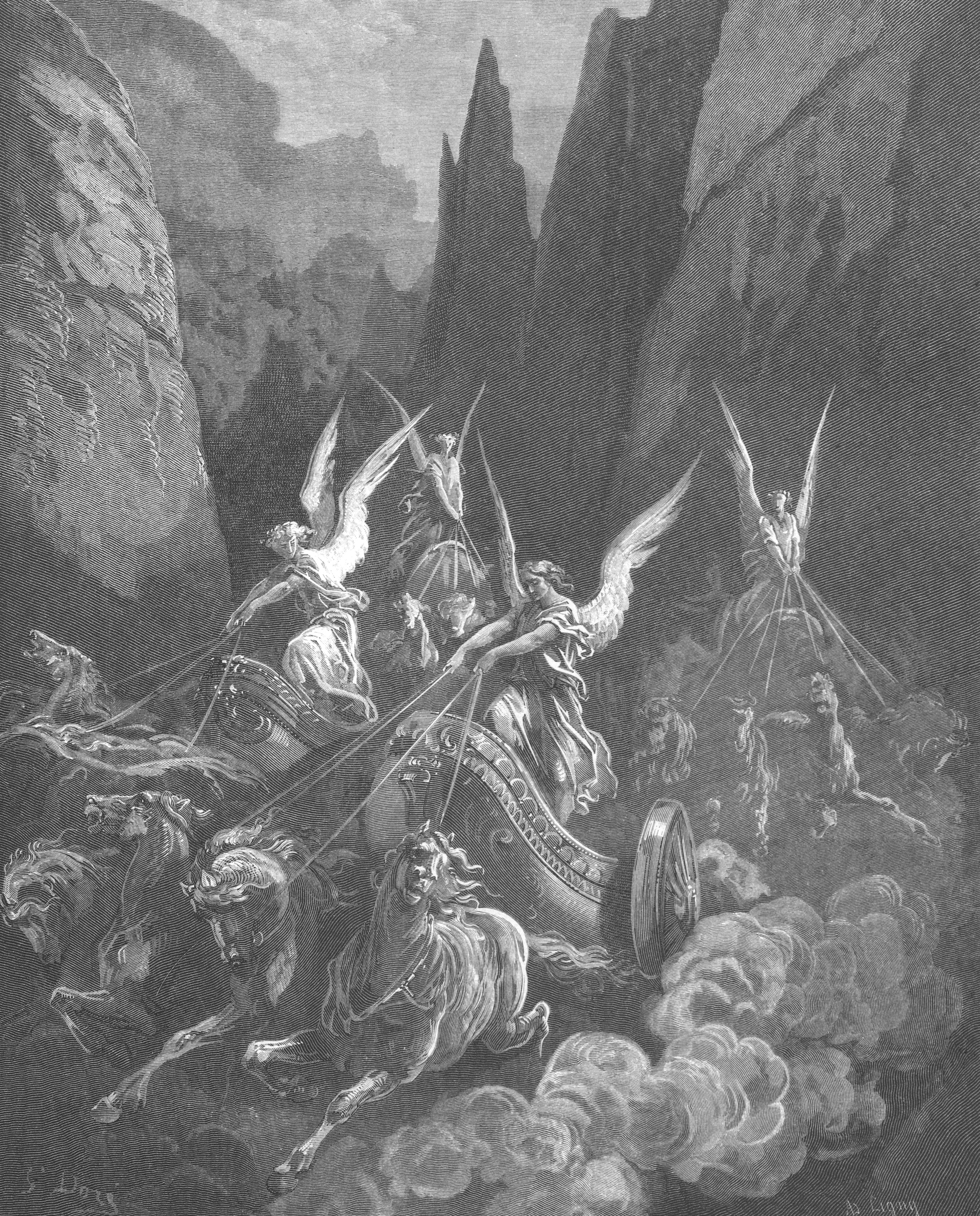
Zechariah's vision of the Four Horsemen of the Apocalypse, engraving by Gustave Doré.

The return from exile is the theological premise of the prophet's visions in chapters 1–6. Chapters 7–8 address the quality of life God wants his renewed people to enjoy, containing many encouraging promises to them. Chapters 9–14 comprise two "oracles" of the future.

=== Chapters 1 to 6 ===
The book begins with a preface in verses 1:1-6, which recalls the role of the "former prophets" in calling Israel in times past to repentance. Then follows a series of eight visions succeeding one another in one night, which may be regarded as a symbolical history of Israel, intended to furnish consolation to the returned exiles and to stir up hope in their minds. These visions include seeing four horses, four horns and four craftsmen, a man with a measuring line, Joshua the High Priest, a gold lampstand and two olive trees, a flying scroll and a woman in a basket, and four chariots. The symbolic action, the crowning of Joshua, describes how the kingdoms of the world become the kingdom of God's Messiah.

The German commentators Carl Friedrich Keil and Franz Delitzsch enumerate seven visions, arguing that the visions conventionally numbered as the sixth and the seventh are better treated as a single vision.

=== Chapters 7 and 8 ===
Two years after the initial visions, chapters 7 and 8 are delivered. They are an answer to the question whether the days of mourning for the destruction of the city should be kept any longer. The answer is addressed to the entire people, assuring them of God's presence and blessing.

=== Chapters 9 to 14 ===
This section consists of two "oracles" or "burdens": the opening words of both chapter 9 and chapter 12 (and also the first chapter of Malachi) announce "The burden of the word of the Lord".

- The first oracle (Zechariah 9–11) gives an outline of the course of God's providential dealings with his people down to the time of the coming of the Messiah, although the opening "burden" is addressed to the foreign nations.
- The second oracle (Zechariah 12–14) points out the glories that await Israel in "the latter day", the final conflict and triumph of God's kingdom. The "burden" in Zechariah 12:1 stands against Israel.

Katrina Larkin argues that there is a unity across these six chapters established by a series of short "linking passages" at 9:9-10, 10:1-2, 11:1-3, 11:17 and 13:7-9". She refers to these passages as compact and metrical, addressed directly to their audience, which contain material linking with both the previous and the subsequent text.

== Themes ==
The purpose of this book is not strictly historical but theological and pastoral. The main emphasis is that God is at work, and all his good deeds, including the construction of the Second Temple, are accomplished "not by might nor by power, but by [his] Spirit". Ultimately, YHWH plans to live again with his people in Jerusalem. He will save them from their enemies and cleanse them from sin. However, God requires repentance, a turning away from sin towards faith in him.

Zechariah's concern for purity is apparent in the temple, priesthood, and all areas of life as the prophecy gradually eliminates the governor's influence in favour of the high priest, and the sanctuary becomes ever more clearly the centre of messianic fulfillment. The prominence of prophecy is quite apparent in Zechariah, but it is also true that Zechariah (along with Haggai) allows prophecy to yield to the priesthood; this is particularly apparent in comparing Zechariah to Third Isaiah (chapters 55–66 of the Book of Isaiah), whose author was active sometime after the first return from exile.

Most Christian commentators read the series of predictions in chapters 7 to 14 as Messianic prophecies, either directly or indirectly. These chapters helped the writers of the Gospels understand Jesus's suffering, death, and resurrection, which they quoted as they wrote of Jesus's final days. Much of the Book of Revelation, which narrates the denouement of history, is also colored by images in Zechariah.

=== Apocalyptic literature ===
Chapters 9–14 of the Book of Zechariah are an early example of apocalyptic literature. Although not as fully developed as the apocalyptic visions described in the Book of Daniel, the "oracles", as they are titled in these chapters, contain apocalyptic elements. One theme these oracles contain is descriptions of the Day of the Lord, when "the Lord will go forth and fight against those nations as when he fights on a day of battle". These chapters also contain "pessimism about the present, but optimism for the future based on the expectation of an ultimate divine victory and the subsequent transformation of the cosmos".

The final portion in Zechariah states that on the Day of the Lord, "there shall be no more the Canaanite in the house of the LORD", proclaiming the need for purity in the Temple, which would come when God judged at the end of time. The Hebrew word כְנַעֲנִי, often translated as "Canaanite", is alternatively translated as "trader" or "trafficker", as in other translations.

== Notes ==
Book of Zechariah Minor prophets
| Preceded by Haggai | Hebrew Bible | Succeeded by Malachi |
| Preceded by Haggai | Christian; Old Testament | Succeeded by Malachi |
