= Ezra 5 =

Chapter in the Book of Ezra

- ← chapter 4 chapter 6 →
- The whole book of Ezra–Nehemiah in the Leningrad Codex (1008 C.E.) from an old fascimile edition.
- Book: Book of Ezra
- Category: Ketuvim
- Christian Bible part: Old Testament
- Order in the Christian part: 15

Ezra 5 is the fifth chapter of the Book of Ezra in the Christian Old Testament and Ezra–Nehemiah in the Hebrew Bible, the latter of which combines the books of Ezra and Nehemiah. Jewish tradition posits that Ezra is the author of Ezra–Nehemiah as well as the Book of Chronicles, but modern scholars

generally claim that a compiler from the 5th century BCE (the so-called "Chronicler") is the final author of the books. The section comprising Ezra 1 to 6 describes Jewish history before the arrival of Ezra to the land of Judah in 468 BCE. Ezra 5 records the contribution of the Hebrew prophets Haggai and Zechariah to the building project of the Second Temple and an investigation by Persian officials.

== Text ==
This chapter is divided into 17 verses. The original text of this chapter is written in Aramaic.

=== Textual witnesses ===
Some early manuscripts containing the text of this chapter in Aramaic are of the Masoretic Text, which includes Codex Leningradensis (1008). (Note: Since 1947 the current text of Aleppo Codex is missing the whole book of Ezra-Nehemiah.) A fragment containing a part of this chapter in Hebrew was found among the Dead Sea Scrolls, that is, 4Q117 (4QEzra; 50 BCE) with the extant verse 17 (= 1 Esdras 6:20).

There is also a translation into Koine Greek known as the Septuagint, made in the last few centuries BCE. Extant ancient manuscripts of the Septuagint version include Codex Vaticanus (B; $\mathfrak{G}$^{B}; 4th century), and Codex Alexandrinus (A; $\mathfrak{G}$^{A}; 5th century). (Note: The extant Codex Sinaiticus only contains Ezra 9:9–10:44.)

An ancient Greek book called 1 Esdras (Greek: Ἔσδρας Αʹ) containing some parts of 2 Chronicles, Ezra and Nehemiah is included in most editions of the Septuagint and is placed before the single book of Ezra–Nehemiah (which is titled in Greek: Ἔσδρας Βʹ). 1 Esdras 6:1–22 is an equivalent of Ezra 5 (The second year of Darius's reign).

== Renewed effort (5:1–2) ==
Through the prophets Haggai and Zechariah, God sent the message of inspiration so the people began the repair of temple again

=== Verse 1 ===
Then the prophets, Haggai the prophet, and Zechariah the son of Iddo, prophesied unto the Jews that were in Judah and Jerusalem in the name of the God of Israel, even unto them.

The prophecies of Haggai and Zechariah are recorded in the Hebrew Bible in the Book of Haggai and Book of Zechariah respectively. Haggai's prophecy period completely covers the time mentioned here (Ezra 4:24; 520 BC), whereas Zechariah's only partly.

=== Verse 2 ===
Then rose up Zerubbabel the son of Shealtiel, and Jeshua the son of Jozadak, and began to build the house of God which is at Jerusalem: and with them were the prophets of God helping them.

- "Zerubbabel": is the leader of the group and of Davidic line (1 Chronicles 3:19), so he is associated with the messianic hope in the book of Zechariah, although none of it is mentioned in this book. His office is not named in this book, but he is identified as the “governor of Judah” in Haggai 1:1, 14; 2:2.
- "Jeshua": or "Joshua". His office is not named in this book, but he is identified as the “high priest” in Haggai 1:1, 12, 14; 2:2; Zechariah 3:1.
- "Jozadak": or "Jehozadak" (1 Chronicles 6:14).

== The investigation (5:3–17) ==
Based on the complaint of the non-Jews, the governor of the area began an investigation into the building project, interviewing the Jewish leaders and sending an inquiry to Darius, the king of Persia.

=== Verse 3 ===
At the same time Tattenai, the governor beyond the River came to them, with Shetharbozenai, and their companions, and asked them, "Who gave you a decree to build this house, and to finish this wall?"

- Tattenai was the governor beyond the River, that is, "Persian governor of the province west of the Euphrates River (eber nāri, "beyond the river") during the reign of Darius I" (522–486 BCE). A number of cuneiform tablets bearing the name Tattenai have survived as part of what may have been a family archive, with one tablet functioning as a promissory note bearing a witness to the transaction involving a servant of "Tattannu, governor of Across-the-River". The clay tablet can be dated accurately to June 5, 502 BCE (the 20th year of Darius I).
- ”House”: refers to "Temple".

=== Verse 6 ===
The copy of the letter that Tattenai, the governor beyond the River, and Shetharbozenai, and his companions the Apharsachites, who were beyond the River, sent to Darius the king follows.

- "The Apharsachites": is considered the same as "Apharsites" and "Apharsathchites" (Ezra 4:9) as the three forms of provincial variants of the word "Parsaya" in Daniel 6:28, which is the Chaldaean equivalent of "Persian", so these people as the "companions" of Tatnai and Shethar-boznai are possibly the Persians who became their body-guard and their soldiers.

=== Verse 8 ===
Be it known to the king that we went into the province of Judah, to the house of the great God, which is built with great stones, and timber is laid in the walls. This work goes on with diligence and prospers in their hands.

- "House": refers to "Temple".
- "Great stones": lit. "stones of rolling", that is, "stones too heavy to be carried", which were therefore moved on rollers.

=== Verse 11 ===
And thus they returned us an answer, saying: “We are the servants of the God of heaven and earth, and we are rebuilding the temple that was built many years ago, which a great king of Israel built and completed.

The "great king of Israel" was Solomon. The conventional dates of Solomon's reign are about 970 to 931 BCE. The Jewish historian Josephus says that "the temple was burnt four hundred and seventy years, six months, and ten days after it was built".

== See also ==
- Darius I
- Jerusalem
- Related Bible parts: Ezra 4, Haggai 1, Haggai 2, Zechariah 1
