= Ezra 6 =

Chapter in the Book of Ezra

- ← chapter 5 chapter 7 →
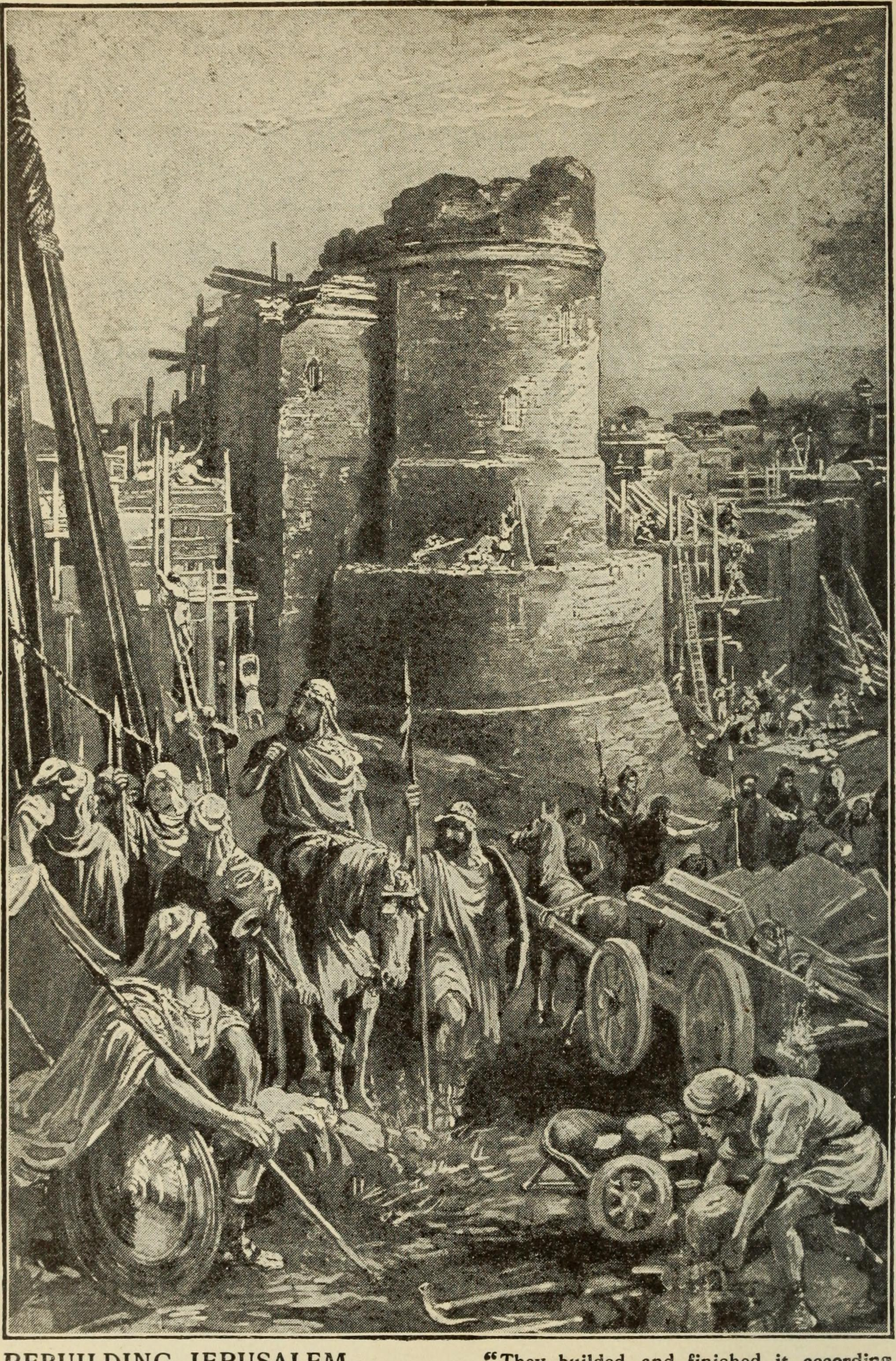
- "They builded, and finished it, according to the commandment of the God of Is-rael..." Ezra 6:14. In: Our day in the light of prophecy and providence (1921).
- Book: Book of Ezra
- Category: Ketuvim
- Christian Bible part: Old Testament
- Order in the Christian part: 15

Ezra 6 is the sixth chapter of the Book of Ezra in the Old Testament of the Christian Bible, or the book of Ezra–Nehemiah in the Hebrew Bible, which treats the book of Ezra and book of Nehemiah as one book. Jewish tradition states that Ezra is the author of Ezra–Nehemiah as well as the Book of Chronicles, but modern scholars generally accept that a compiler from the 5th century BCE (the so-called "Chronicler") is the final author of these books. The section comprising chapter 1 to 6 describes the history before the arrival of Ezra in the land of Judah in 468 BCE. This chapter records the response of the Persian court to the report from Tattenai in the previous chapter: a search is made for the original decree by Cyrus the Great and this is confirmed with a new decree from Darius the Great allowing the temple to be built. This chapter closes this first part of the book in a "glorious conclusion with the completion of the new temple and the celebration of Passover" by the people, as their worship life is restored according to the Law of Moses.

== Text ==
This chapter is divided into 22 verses. The original text of this chapter from 6:1 through 6:18 is in Aramaic, from 6:19 through 6:22 is in Hebrew language.

=== Textual witnesses ===
Some early manuscripts containing the text of this chapter in Hebrew/Aramaic are of the Masoretic Text, which includes Codex Leningradensis (1008). (Note: Since 1947 the current text of Aleppo Codex is missing the whole book of Ezra-Nehemiah.) Fragments containing parts of this chapter were found among the Dead Sea Scrolls, that is, 4Q117 (4QEzra; 50 BCE) with extant verses 1–5 (= 1 Esdras 6:21–25).

There is also a translation into Koine Greek known as the Septuagint, made in the last few centuries BCE. Extant ancient manuscripts of the Septuagint version include Codex Vaticanus (B; $\mathfrak{G}$^{B}; 4th century), and Codex Alexandrinus (A; $\mathfrak{G}$^{A}; 5th century). (Note: The extant Codex Sinaiticus only contains Ezra 9:9–10:44.)

An ancient Greek book called 1 Esdras (Greek: Ἔσδρας Αʹ) containing some parts of 2 Chronicles, Ezra and Nehemiah is included in most editions of the Septuagint and is placed before the single book of Ezra–Nehemiah (which is titled in Greek: Ἔσδρας Βʹ). 1 Esdras 6:23–7:9 is an equivalent of Ezra 6:1–18 (The temple is finished), whereas 1 Esdras 7:10–15 is equivalent to Ezra 6:19–22 (Celebration of the Passover).

== The Persian response to the Temple (6:1–12) ==
The Persian court searched the royal archive to investigate the historical claim of the Jews for rebuilding the temple, first in Babylon, according to Tattenai's suggestion (Ezra 5:17) but they found a scroll containing Cyrus's edict in Ecbatana (modern Hamadan in northern Iran, former capital of the Median Empire.) Darius the king of Persia issued a decree supporting the temple building project.

=== Verse 1 ===
Then Darius the king made a decree, and search was made in the house of the rolls, where the treasures were laid up in Babylon.

- "House of the rolls": or "house of the scrolls"

=== Verse 2 ===
And there was found at Achmetha, in the palace that is in the province of the Medes, a roll, and therein was a record thus written:

- "Achmetha": probably "Ecbatana", the ancient capital of Media. The discovery of the Aramaic version of the edict in this city is consistent with a non-biblical information that Cyrus regularly spent the summer period in this city, where he first rose to power (while also staying in other majestic capitals: Babylon and Susa in Elam (cf. Esther 1:5) in each other season of the year), including during the 'first summer of his reign over the whole Empire' (538 BC). Ecbatana is believed to be located in Hagmatana Hill (Tappe-ye Hagmatāna), an archaeological mound in Hamadan.

=== Verse 3 ===
In the first year of King Cyrus, King Cyrus issued a decree concerning the house of God at Jerusalem: “Let the house be rebuilt, the place where they offered sacrifices; and let the foundations of it be firmly laid, its height sixty cubits and its width sixty cubits,

- "Sixty cubits": about 90 feet, or 27 meters. A cubit is the length from the tip of the middle finger to the elbow on a man's arm, or about 18 inches or 46 centimeters. The dimension here could refer to the measurement for Solomon's Temple in 1 Kings 6:2.

The Aramaic memorandum of the decree (parallel to Ezra 1:2–4) provides evidence that Cyrus's edict is real and it may span to a number of different documents according to their functions, such as the edict in verses 2b–5, which could be the treasury record to certify that the vessels from the temple in Jerusalem have been returned to the Jews, as it contains extra information compared to the version of the decree in chapter 1. The measurement of the temple (verse 3) and the directions about the manner of the building (verse 4) may be designed "to set limits to royal expenditure of the project".

=== Verse 8 ===
Moreover I issue a decree as to what you shall do for the elders of these Jews, for the building of this house of God: Let the cost be paid at the king’s expense from taxes on the region beyond the River; this is to be given immediately to these men, so that they are not hindered.

- "House": refers to "Temple".

The reply letter of Darius to Tattenai opens with the cited words of Cyrus, but immediately follows with his own decree, confirming entirely the measures of his predecessor and reapply them to the new situation.

=== Verse 13 ===
Then Tattenai, governor of the region beyond the River, Shethar-Boznai, and their companions diligently did according to what King Darius had sent.

- "Tattenai, the governor beyond the River": that is, "Persian governor of the province west of the Euphrates River” (Hebrews: eber nāri; Aramaic: עבר־נהרה, ‘ă-ḇar-na-hă-rāh; "across or beyond the river") during the reign of Darius I" (522–486 BCE). A number of cuneiform tablets bearing the name Tattenai have survived as part of what may have been a family archive, with one tablet functioning as a promissory note bearing a witness to the transaction involving a servant of "Tattannu, governor of Across-the-River". The clay tablet can be dated accurately to June 5, 502 BCE (the 20th year of Darius I).
- "Diligently": or "with all diligence", is translated from the term osparna in the sense of "exactly, perfectly" as in the language of obedience, which can also rendered 'without delay', 'in full', 'with all diligence', giving a clear message that 'a powerful authority has spoken' (Ezra 5:8; 6:8, 12, 13; 7:17, 21, 26; cf Deuteronomy 4:6; 5:1; 6:3).

== Completion and dedication of the Temple (6:13–18) ==
Following the command of God and the decrees issued by Cyrus, Darius and Artaxerxes, kings of Persia, the Jews worked diligently, so the Temple was finally completed and the people could celebrate the dedication of it.

=== Verse 14 ===
So the elders of the Jews built, and they prospered through the prophesying of Haggai the prophet and Zechariah the son of Iddo. And they built and finished it, according to the commandment of the God of Israel, and according to the command of Cyrus, Darius, and Artaxerxes king of Persia.

- "Command" (KJV: "commandment"): or "Decree".

The prophecies of Haggai and Zechariah are recorded in the Hebrew Bible under the name of the Book of Haggai and Book of Zechariah, respectively. Haggai's prophecy period completely covers the time mentioned here (Ezra 4:24; 520 BC), whereas Zechariah's only partly.

=== Verse 15 ===
And this house was finished on the third day of the month Adar, which was in the sixth year of the reign of Darius the king.

The date corresponds to February 21, 515 B.C. Haggai (Haggai 1:15) writes that the building project was recommenced on the 24th day of the month Elul (the 6th month; September) in the second year of Darius (September 21, 520 BC), so it took nearly 4.5 years to finish, although the foundations had been laid some twenty years earlier (April 536 BC; cf. Ezra 3:8). Therefore, it was completed around 70 years after its destruction in 587–586 BC, close to Jeremiah's prediction.

=== Verse 17 ===
And offered at the dedication of this house of God an hundred bullocks, two hundred rams, four hundred lambs; and for a sin offering for all Israel, twelve he goats, according to the number of the tribes of Israel.

- "A sin offering": from Hebrew written word לחטיא, lə-ḥaṭ-ṭā-yā, to be read as לְחַטָּאָ֤ה, lə-ḥaṭ-ṭā-’āh.
- "He goats": "male goats" from Hebrew עִזִּ֜ין, ‘iz-zîn, a plural word only used here in the whole Hebrew Bible.

=== Verse 18 ===
And they set the priests in their divisions, and the Levites in their courses, for the service of God, which is at Jerusalem; as it is written in the book of Moses.

This verse refers to ‘the organization of the priests and Levites described in 1 Chronicles 23–26’, which distributes the service of the Temple by periods, of a week each, among the courses and divisions of priests and Levites (cf. 2 Kings 11:9; 2 Chronicles 23:4).

== Celebrating Passover (6:19–22) ==
In keeping with the law of Moses, Passover is celebrated following the dedication of the temple, and this marks the ‘renewal of religious life’ of the people.

=== Verse 19 ===
And the children of the captivity kept the passover upon the fourteenth day of the first month.

The Hebrew language resumes in verse 19 and continues through 7:11. The Passover on the 14th of the first month (Nisan) was commanded in Exodus 12:6, but since then only few celebrations are recorded in Hebrew Bible, as follows:

- (1) under Moses on the second year after the Exodus (Numbers 9:5)
- (2) under Joshua at Gilgal after the circumcision of the people (Joshua 5:10)
- (3) in the reign of Hezekiah, after the purification of the Temple (2 Chronicles 30:1–2ff.)
- (4) in the reign of Josiah, after the religious reformation (2 Kings 23:21; 2 Chronicles 35)
- (5) under Zerubbabel and Jeshua (Ezra 6).

The celebration of the Passover on each of these occasions marks “a new or a restored order of worship, and the solemn rededication by the people of their Covenant relation with God”.

== See also ==
- Darius I
- Jerusalem
- Related Bible parts: Ezra 4, Haggai 1, Haggai 2, Zechariah 1

== Sources ==
- Fensham, F. Charles (1982). The Books of Ezra and Nehemiah. New international commentary on the Old Testament (illustrated ed.). Wm. B. Eerdmans Publishing. ISBN 978-0802825278.
- Fitzmyer, Joseph A. (2008). A Guide to the Dead Sea Scrolls and Related Literature. Grand Rapids, MI: William B. Eerdmans Publishing Company. ISBN 9780802862419.
- Grabbe, Lester L. (2003). "Ezra". In Dunn, James D. G.; Rogerson, John William (eds.). Eerdmans Commentary on the Bible (illustrated ed.). Wm. B. Eerdmans Publishing. pp. 313–319. ISBN 978-0802837110.
- Halley, Henry H. (1965). Halley's Bible Handbook: an abbreviated Bible commentary (24th (revised) ed.). Zondervan Publishing House. ISBN 0-310-25720-4.
- Larson, Knute; Dahlen, Kathy; Anders, Max E. (2005). Anders, Max E. (ed.). Holman Old Testament Commentary - Ezra, Nehemiah, Esther. Vol. 9 (illustrated ed.). B&H Publishing Group. ISBN 978-0805494693.
- Levering, Matthew (2007). Ezra & Nehemiah. Brazos Theological Commentary on the Bible. Brazos Press. ISBN 978-1587431616.
- McConville, J. G. (1985). Ezra, Nehemiah, and Esther. The daily study Bible : Old Testament. Westminster John Knox Press. ISBN 978-0664245832.
- Smith-Christopher, Daniel L. (2007). "15. Ezra-Nehemiah". In Barton, John; Muddiman, John (eds.). The Oxford Bible Commentary (first (paperback) ed.). Oxford University Press. pp. 308–324. ISBN 978-0199277186.
- Ulrich, Eugene, ed. (2010). The Biblical Qumran Scrolls: Transcriptions and Textual Variants. Brill.
- Würthwein, Ernst (1995). The Text of the Old Testament. Translated by Rhodes, Erroll F. Grand Rapids, MI: Wm. B. Eerdmans. ISBN 0-8028-0788-7.
