= Ohel =

Ohel may refer to:

- Ohel (social services), a children's home and family services organization in New York
- Ohel (biblical figure), the son of Zerubbabel, mentioned in I Chronicles
- Ohel (Chabad-Lubavitch), burial place of the sixth and seventh Lubavitcher Rebbes
- Ohel (grave), a structure built over the graves of Rebbes, prophets and tzaddikim
- Ohel Theater, an Israeli theater company, active 1925–1969

== See also ==
- Ohel Leah Synagogue, Hong Kong
- Ohel Rachel Synagogue, Shanghai
