= Berechiah =

Berechiah /bɛrəˈkaɪ.ə/ is a Jewish name that occurs several times in the Bible. It is derived from Berakhah, "blessing".

== People named Berechiah ==
=== In scripture ===
- the father of the Hebrew prophet Zechariah and son of Iddo, according to Zechariah 1:1, but probably not the prophet by the same name. In Isaiah 8:2, he is referred to by the longer form of the same name, Jeberechiah or Jeberekiah.
- son of Zerubbabel, according to 1 Chronicles 3:19–20 and the Seder Olam Zutta, was an Exilarch in Babylon

=== Other people with that name ===
- Berechiah ha-Nakdan, 13th century writer and fabulist
- Berechiah de Nicole, also known as Benedict fil Mosse, a 13th-century Tosafist who lived at Lincoln, England
- Berechiah Berak ben Isaac Eisik Shapira (died 1664), Galician preacher
