= Apame (concubine) =

Apame was first mentioned in 1 Esdras 4:29

Yet I have seen him with Apame, the king's concubine, the daughter of the illustrious Bartacus; she would sit at the king's right hand

The preceding quotation is part of the Darius Contest interpolation. Versions of the story, which include Apame are found in Josephus and John Gower's Confessio Amantis. Alcuin Blamire describes the "Darius Contest" as important in "the discourse of anti-misogyny." The ""Darius contest" includes three versions which omit Apame.

Scholars differ as to the identity of the king mentioned in 1 Esdras 3.4 and other sources. Josephus 3.1 says the king is the son (Darius I) of Hystaspes. Vanderkam also favours Darius I. Gower (vii.1889) changes the king’s name to Cirus (Cyrus the Great). Cook suggests the names may not refer to historical characters. If real characters are the source, the candidates are Darius I or Darius III or Darius III. There are two theories as to the source for Apame. Coggins and Knibb suggest a Persian name such as Apama or Apama II. Torrey suggests "we must look either to Egypt or Antioch."

== Image gallery ==
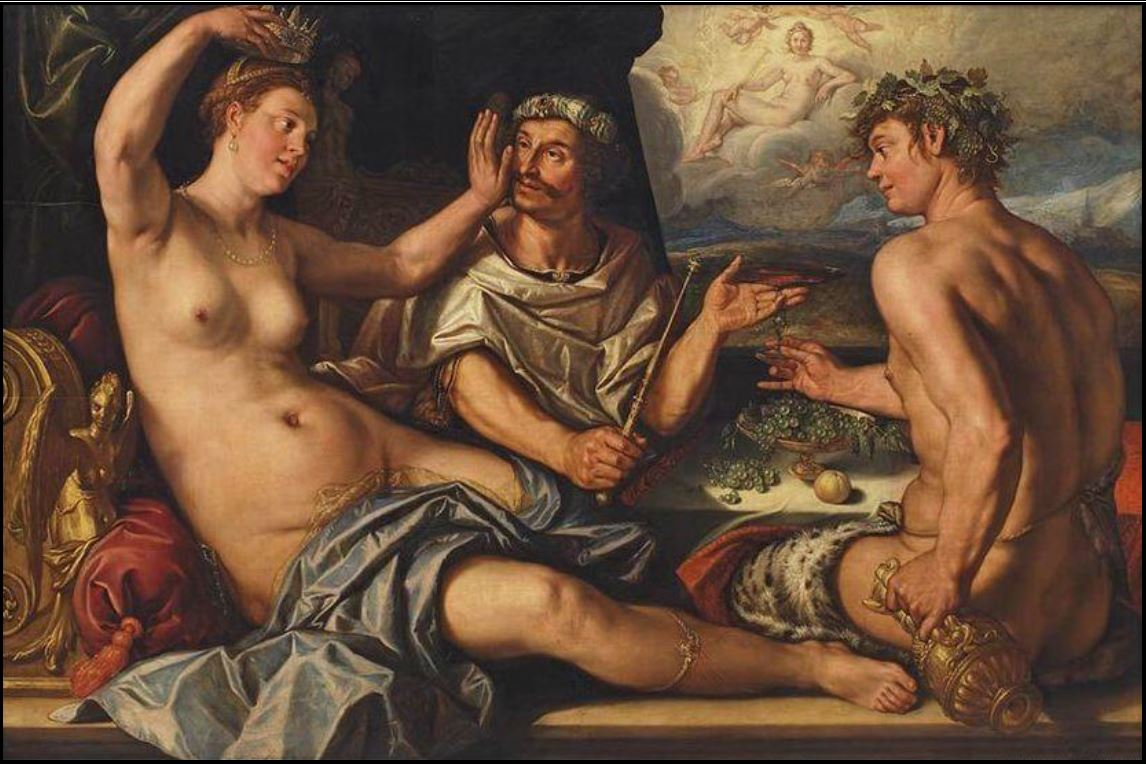
Apame and Darius are portrayed in Hendrick Goltzius’s painting Apame usurps the king’s crown.
