= Zerubbabel Before Darius =

Painting by Nicolaus Knupfer

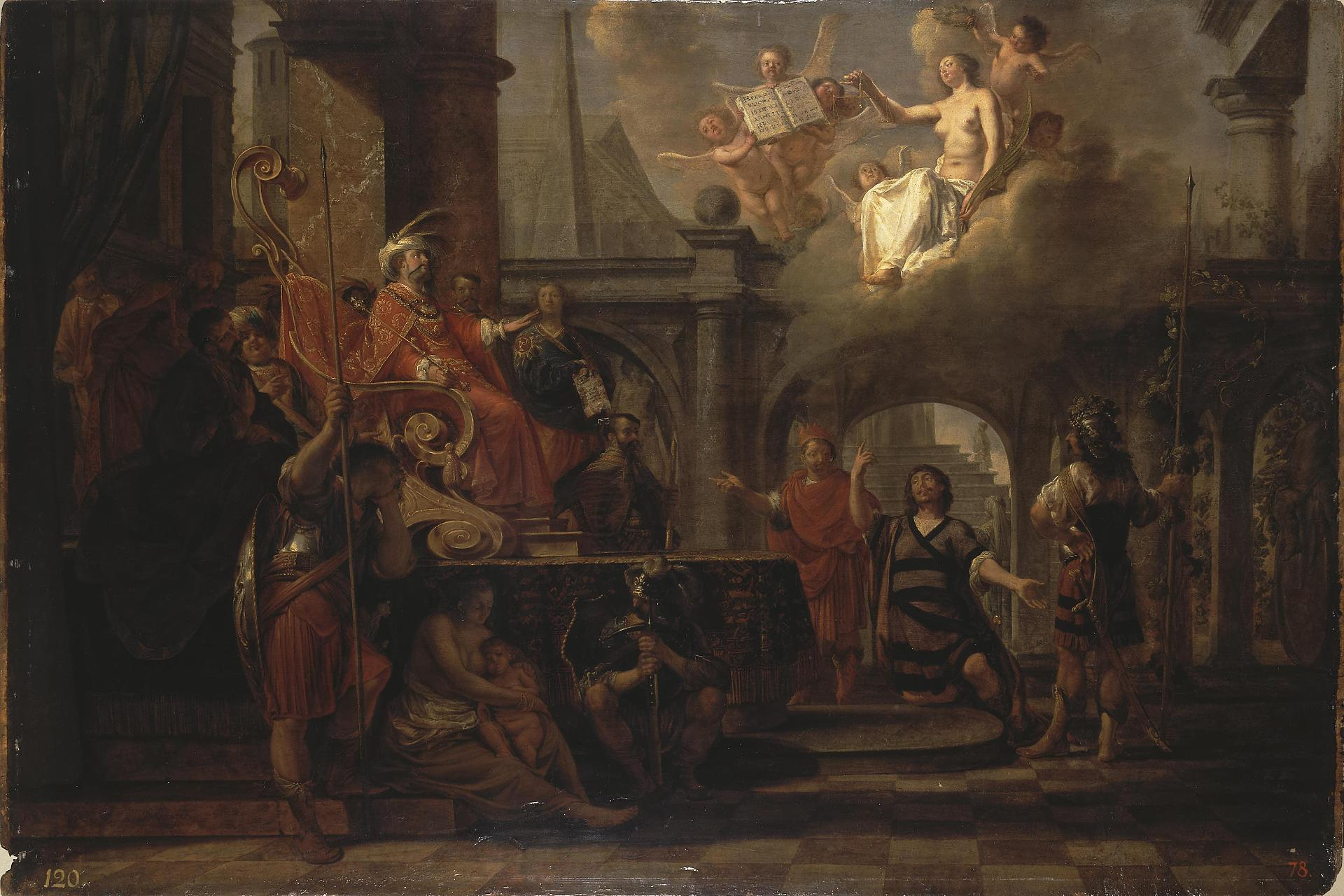
Zerubbabel Before Darius by Nikolaus Knüpfer

Zerubbabel Before Darius is an oil on oak panel painting by Nikolaus Knüpfer, now in the Hermitage Museum, in Saint Petersburg (inv. GE-6980). It was dated to after 1644 by Jo Saxton, a date also accepted by the work's owner. The work is signed at the foot of the throne on the left hand side. The frame is significantly damaged and the bottom right of the panel is chipped away.

It illustrates the 'Darius contest', an episode in 1 Esdras (3:4 to 4:63) in which Darius's bodyguards debated what was the strongest thing in existence. One spoke argued it to be wine and another that it was the king, but Darius judged the competition won by Zerubbabel, who argued "Women are strongest, but above all things truth is victor". It has previously been mistitled The Story of Artaxerxes, Daniel Defending Susanna from Slander and Allegory of Justice, with Kuznetsov restoring the present title in 1974, though Dutch writers now referring to it as Zerubbabel Asking Darius's Permission to Restore the Temple in Jerusalem, referring to the reward granted to Zerubbabel by Darius for winning the debate (4:42-63).

It first appears in the written record on 10 May 1764, when it was bought by privy counsellor Broggia in Bonn at a posthumous auction of Clemens August of Bavaria's collection. It was acquired by Paul I of Russia at the end of the 18th century - on the reverse is Paul's red wax seal and a label inscribed "ПДМ 1919", referring to the Pavlovsk Palace Museum, where it was kept. Two numbers are painted onto the work - 120 at bottom left in white (its inventory number in the Pavlovsk Palace) and 78 in red at bottom right (meaning unclear). In the 1920s plans were mooted to sell it abroad and it was moved to the Soviet Antiquities Office, but the sale did not occur and it was moved to its present collection in 1931.
