= Christian M. M. Brady =

American targumist

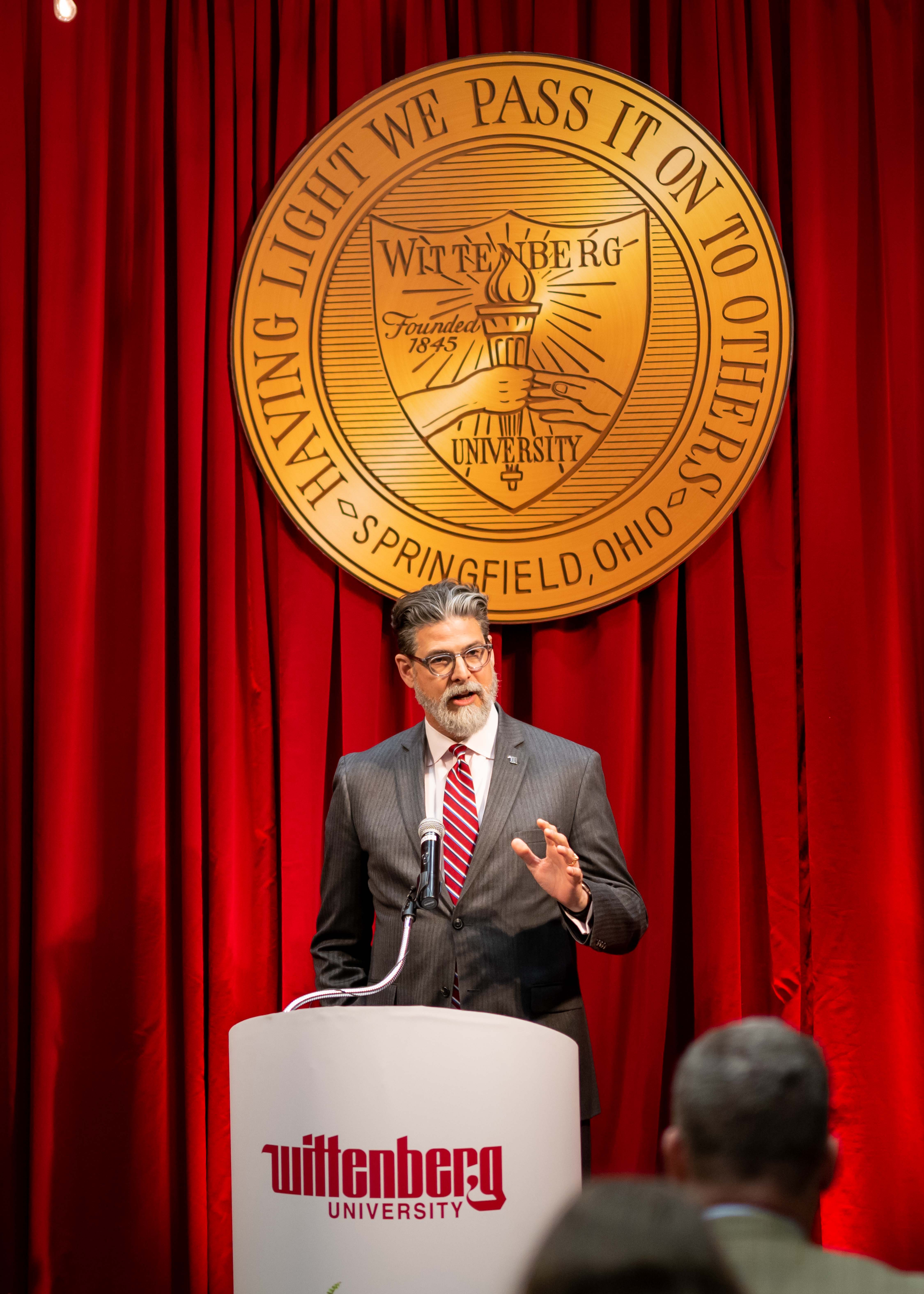
- Brady in 2025
- Born: September 9, 1968 (age 58); Houston, Texas, United States
- Occupations: Scholar, academic administrator, author
- Title: President, professor
- Board member of: Society of Biblical Literature, International Organization for Targumic Studies

Academic background
- Education: Cornell University (BA); Wheaton College, IL (MA); University of Oxford (DPhil)
- Thesis: Targuman Lamentations' Reading of the Book of Lamentations
- Doctoral advisors: Philip S. Alexander and Alison G. Salvesen

Academic work
- Discipline: Biblical studies, Rabbinic literature
- Sub-discipline: Targum, Exegesis
- Institutions: Tulane University, Penn State University, University of Kentucky, Wittenberg University
- Website: http://ChristianBrady.com

Christian M. M. Brady (born 1968) is an American scholar who specializes in biblical literature, rabbinic literature, and the targumim, especially Targum Lamentations and Targum Ruth. As of June 1, 2025, he became the 16th president of Wittenberg University in Springfield, Ohio. He was the inaugural dean of the Lewis Honors College and professor of Modern and Classical Languages, Literatures, and Cultures at the University of Kentucky (2017-2025). He was interim dean of the College of Arts & Sciences at the University of Kentucky from 2020 to 2022. He was dean of the Schreyer Honors College from 2006 to 2016. He was formerly associate professor of Classical Studies and Jewish Studies at Tulane University. His administrative roles at Tulane included associate director of the Jewish Studies Program (1997-1998), director of the Jewish Studies Program (1998-2003), associate director of the Honors Program (2003-2004), and director of the Honors Program (2004–2006).

== Education ==
Brady grew up in Montgomery Village, Maryland, and went to high school in Damascus, Maryland. He received a B.A. from Cornell University in History and Near Eastern Studies with a concentration in Religious Studies. He went on to earn an M.A. from Wheaton College in Illinois in Biblical and Theological Studies, a graduate diploma in Jewish Studies from the Oxford Centre for Hebrew and Jewish Studies at the University of Oxford, and a D.Phil. in Oriental Studies from the University of Oxford where he was a member of St. Cross College.

== Books ==
- The Rabbinic Targum of Lamentations: Vindicating God, Studies in the Aramaic Interpretation of Scripture. Vol. 3. Leiden: E. J. Brill, 2003.
- The Proselyte and the Prophet: Character Development in Targum Ruth, Supplements to Aramaic Studies. Vol. 14. Leiden: E. J. Brill, 2016.
- Beautiful and Terrible Things: A Christian Struggle with Suffering, Grief, and Hope. Louisville: Westminster John Knox Press, 2020.

== Articles and shorter pieces ==
- “The Date, Provenance, and Sitz im Leben of Targum Lamentations,” Journal of the Aramaic Bible 1 (1999): 5-29.
- The following entries in The Eerdmans Dictionary of the Bible. Edited by David N. Freedman. Grand Rapids: Eerdmans, 2000.
  - “Adino”
  - "Chezib”
  - “Dial of Ahaz”
  - "Jashubi-Lehem”
  - “Kiriathaim”
  - “Lilith”
  - “Maonites”
  - “Pahath-Moab”
  - “Rod”
  - "Sun”
  - “Zuzim”
- “The Role of the midat dinah in the Targumim.” Pages 364–374 in Studies in Scripture in Early Judaism and Christianity, The Interpretation of Scripture in Early Judaism and Christianity. Edited by Craig A. Evans. Sheffield: Sheffield Press, 2000.
- “Vindicating God,” Journal of the Aramaic Bible 3.1/2 (2001): 27–40.
- “Targum Lamentations 1.1-4: A Theological Prologue.” In Targum and Scripture: Studies in Aramaic Translation and Interpretation in Memory of Ernest G. Clarke. In Studies in the Aramaic Interpretation of Scripture. Edited by Ernest Ernest George Clarke, Paul Virgil McCracken Flesher. Leiden: Brill, 2002.
- The following entries in The Dictionary for Theological Interpretation of Scripture. Edited by Kevin J. Vanhoozer, Craig G. Bartholomew, Daniel J. Treier, and N. T. Wright. Grand Rapids: Baker Academic Press, 2005:
  - “Lamentations"
  - “Targum”
- The following entries in The Brill Encyclopaedia of Early Religious and Philosophical Writings. Edited by Jacob Neusner and Alan J. Avery-Peck. Leiden: E. J. Brill, 2007:
  - “Targum Canticles”
  - “Targum Ruth”
  - “Targum Lamentations”
  - “Targum Kohelet”
  - “Targum Esther”
  - “Targum Psalms”
  - “Targum Job”
  - “Targum Proverbs”
  - “Targumim to the Ketuvim”
  - “Targum Chronicles”
- “The Use of Eschatological Lists In The Targumim To The Megillot,” Journal For The Study Of Judaism 40 (2009): 493–509.
- “Targum Lamentations”. In Great Is Thy Faithfulness? : Reading Lamentations As Sacred Scripture. Edited by Robin A. Parry and Heath Thomas. Eugene, Or.: Pickwick Publications, 2011.
- “Appendix 2: A Translation of Targum Lamentations”. In Great Is Thy Faithfulness? : Reading Lamentations As Sacred Scripture. Edited by Robin A. Parry and Heath Thomas. Eugene, Or.: Pickwick Publications, 2011.
- “‘God Is Not in This Classroom’ or Teaching the Bible in a Secular Context". In Teaching The Bible In The Liberal Arts Classroom. Edited by Glenn S. Holland and Jane S. Webster. Sheffield, UK: Sheffield Phoenix Press, 2012.
- “The Conversion of Ruth in Targum Ruth,” Review of Rabbinic Judaism 16.2(2013).
- “The Five Scrolls.” In The Textual History of the Bible. Edited by Armin Lange and Emanuel Tov. Leiden: Brill, Forthcoming.
- “What Shall We Remember, The Deeds or The Faith of Our Ancestors? A Comparison of 1 Maccabees 2 and Hebrews 11.” In Festscrift for Bruce Chilton. Edited by Jack Neusner and Craig Evans. Forthcoming.
- “Exegetical Similarities and the Liturgical Use of the Targumim of the Megilloth,” Aramaic Studies 12 (2014).
- “What Shall We Remember, The Deeds or The Faith of Our Ancestors? A Comparison of 1 Maccabees 2 and Hebrews 11.” In Earliest Christianity within the Boundaries of Judaism. Essays in Honor of Bruce Chilton. Ed., Neusner, Jack and Craig Evans. Leiden: Brill, 2016.
- “The Five Scrolls.” In The Textual History of the Bible. Ed., Lange, Armin, and Emanuel Tov. Leiden: Brill, 2016.

== Family life ==
Brady is married to Elizabeth Walma Brady. They have a daughter, Isabel (Izzy), and a son, Mack, who died aged 8 on December 31, 2012. Mack's death prompted an outpouring of sympathy from the local community. A scholarship fund established in Mack's name supports Penn State soccer.

== Blog and podcasts ==
While dean of the Schreyer Honors College, Brady had a dynamic blog and podcast. The podcasts featured engaging conversations with Schreyer Scholars, his state of the college address, and his vision for the future of the honors college. Some of his blog posts have been moved to his personal site. Brady also blogs about professional and personal issues at targument.org.

In his new position as dean of the Lewis Honors College, he also somewhat regularly hosts a podcast. Faculty and students from the UK often appear on this podcast. All podcasts are recorded live in the Honors College Lounge, and all Honors students are welcome to attend and interact with Brady.

== Other activities ==
Brady is also an ordained priest in the Episcopal Church (USA) and Canon Theologian for the Episcopal Diocese of Lexington (Kentucky). He served as a lay trustee (2004-2006) of the University of the South, and was elected and served as a clergy trustee member from 2020 to 2024.

Brady was a regular guest on the podcast Real Tech for Real People, discussing issues of general tech and technology in education.

He appeared as a contestant on NPR's Wait, Wait, Don't Tell Me on February 27, 2021.

== Bibliography ==
- Brady, Christian M. M. Beautiful and Terrible Things: A Christian Struggle with Suffering, Grief, and Hope (Louisville, KY: Westminster John Knox Press, 2020). ISBN 9780664266127.
- Brady, Christian M.M. The Proselyte and the Prophet: Character Development in Targum Ruth (Leiden: E. J. Brill, 2016). ISBN 978-90-04-32967-6.
- Brady, Christian M.M. The Rabbinic Targum of Lamentations: Vindicating God (Leiden: E. J. Brill, 2003). ISBN 978-90-04-12163-8.
- Brady, Christian M.M. “Targum Lamentations’ Reading of the Book of Lamentations” (1MB pdf), Doctoral Thesis, Oxford, 2000.
- Brady's English translation of Targum Lamentations.
- Brady's English translation of Targum Ruth.
