= Zerubbabel =

Biblical figure; governor of the Achaemenid province of Yehud

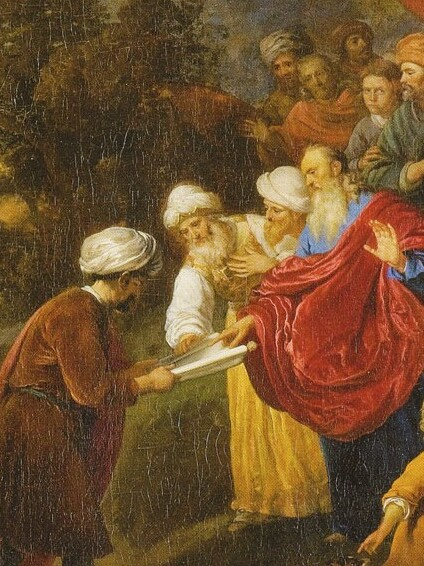
- Zerubbabel and Cyrus (1650s) by Jacob van Loo; Zerubbabel (left) shows the Persian king Cyrus the Great the plan for a rebuilt Jerusalem

Leader of the House of David
- Predecessor: Shealtiel, his father
- Successor: Line Lost

Governor of Judea
- Predecessor: Sheshbazzar
- Successor: Elnathan

Prince of Judah
- Predecessor: Shealtiel, his father
- Successor: Meshullam
- Born: c. 587–539 BC; Babylon
- Died: unknown
- Issue: Meshullam; Hananiah; Shelomith; Hashubah; Ohel; Berechiah; Hasadiah; Jushab-hesed; Rhesa (New Testament); Abihud (NT)
- House: House of David
- Father: Shealtiel or Pedaiah

Zerubbabel (/zəˈrʌbəbəl/, (Biblical Hebrew: זְרֻבָּבֶל, romanized: Zerubbāḇel from Akkadian: 𒆰𒆍𒀭𒊏𒆠, romanized: Zērubābili) (Note: Biblical Greek: Ζοροβάβελ, romanized: Zorovável; Latin: Zorobabel, /zəˈrʌbəbəl/)), also spelled or Zorobabel, was a governor of the Achaemenid Empire's province of Judea and the grandson of Jeconiah, penultimate king of Judah.

He is solely documented in the Hebrew Bible, in which he led the first group of Jews, numbering 42,360, who returned from the Babylonian captivity in the first year of Cyrus the Great, the king of the Achaemenid Empire. The date is generally thought to have been between 538 and 520 BC. Zerubbabel also laid the foundation of the Second Temple in Jerusalem soon after. In the New Testament he is included in the genealogy of Jesus.

== Etymology ==
Zerubbabel means seed of Babylon, showing how quickly the elites integrated into the Babylonian social structure.

== Story ==
In all of the accounts in the Hebrew Bible that mention Zerubbabel, he is always associated with the high priest who returned with him, Joshua, son of Jozadak (Jehozadak). Together, these two men led the first wave of Jewish returnees from exile and began to rebuild the Temple. Old Testament theologian John Kessler describes the region of Judah as a small province that contained land extending 25 km from Jerusalem and was independently ruled prior to the Persian rule.

Appointed by Darius the Great, Zerubbabel was governor of Yehud province. It was after this appointment that Zerubbabel began to rebuild the Temple. Elias Bickerman speculates that one of the reasons that Zerubbabel was able to rebuild the Temple was because of "the widespread revolts at the beginning of the reign of Darius I in 522 BC, which preoccupied him to such a degree that Zerubbabel felt he could initiate the rebuilding of the temple without repercussions".

== Zerubbabel and the Davidic line ==
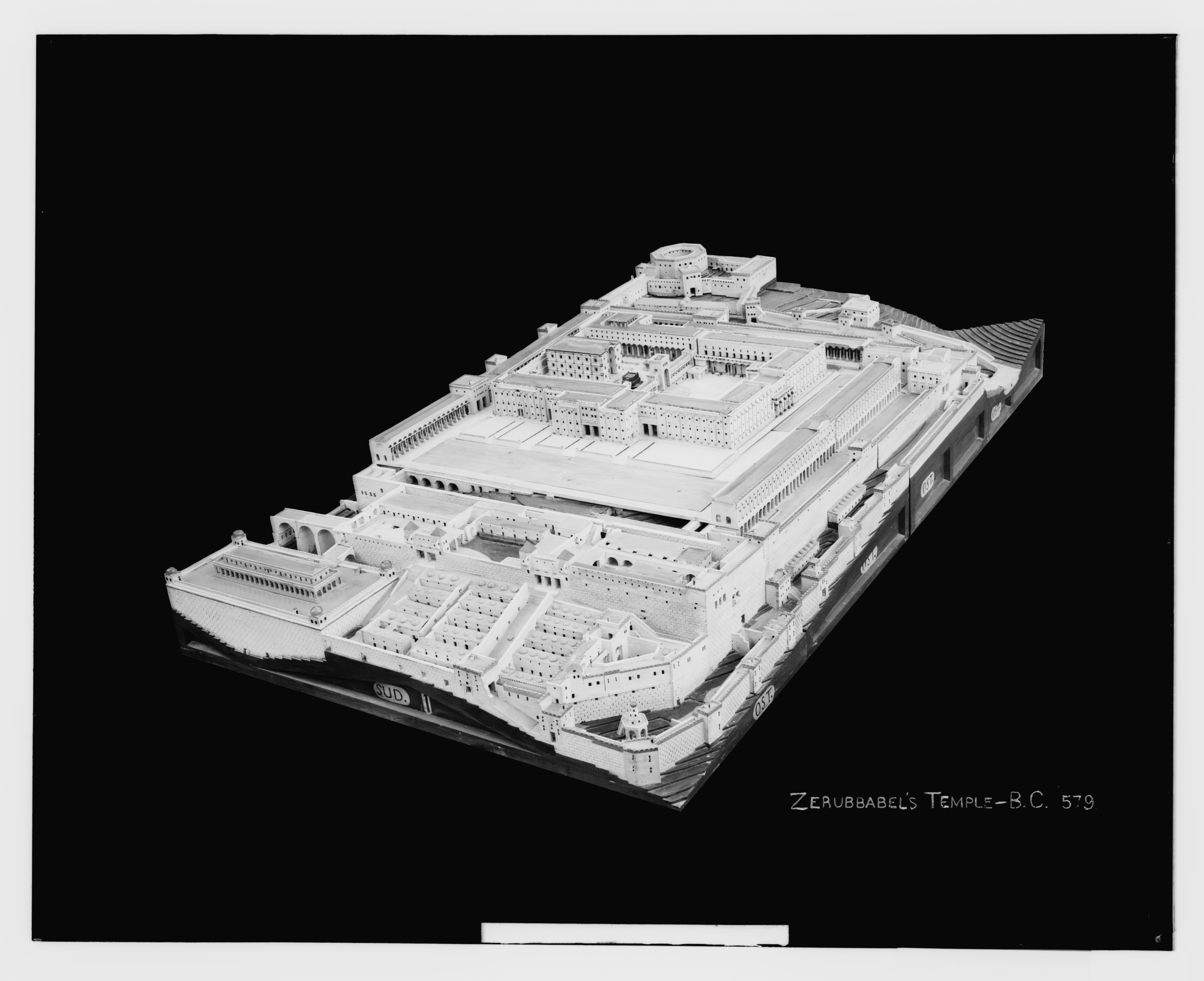
Representation of Zerubbabal's Temple, artist unknown, c. 1898–1946. G. Eric and Edith Matson Photograph Collection at the Library of Congress

The Davidic line from Jeconiah had been cursed by Jeremiah, saying that no offspring of "Coniah" would sit on the throne (Jeremiah 22:30). However, Zerubbabel was of the main Davidic line through Solomon and Jeconiah.

The prophets Zechariah and Haggai both give unclear statements regarding Zerubbabel's authority in their oracles, in which Zerubbabel was either the subject of a false prophecy or the receiver of a divine promotion to kingship. He could also be viewed as a governor of a state within another nation and thus technically "not on the throne" of a nation. Either way, he was given the task of rebuilding the Temple in the second year of the reign of Darius I (520 BC), along with the high priest Joshua son of Jehozadak.

Muslim historian Ya'qubi (died 897/8) attributed the recovery of the Torah and the Books of the Prophets to him instead of Ezra. The Seder Olam Zutta chronicle from 803 AD lists him as the Exilarch in Babylon to succeed Shealtiel. Several Old Testament texts (see subsection) are conflicting as to whether Zerubbabel was the son or nephew of Shealtiel. His son Meshullam succeeded him as Exilarch, and was followed by another son Hananiah. His other sons were Hashubah, Ohel, Berechiah, Hasadiah and Jushab-hesed (1 Chronicles 3:20). He also had a daughter called Shelomith (1 Chronicles 3:19).

Zerubbabel may have had a Babylonian style name because of his interaction with the Babylonian court.

=== Sheshbazzar ===
The Book of Ezra begins with Cyrus the Great entrusting the Temple vessels to Sheshbazzar (Hebrew: שֵׁשְׁבַּצַּר, Modern: Šešbaṣár, Tiberian: Šēšbaṣṣar, "prince of Judah", probably from Akkadian: 𒌓𒀜𒋀, romanized: Šamaš-abu-uṣur); this apparently important figure disappears from the story entirely after being named in Ezra 1:8 and Ezra 5:14, and Zerubbabel is abruptly introduced as the main figure. Both are called governors of Judah and are both credited with laying the foundation of the Temple. A number of explanations have been proposed, including: (1) the two are the same person; (2) Sheshbazzar was in fact Shenazzar (probably from Akkadian: 𒂗𒍪𒋀, romanized: Sîn-uṣur), Zerubabbel's uncle (mentioned in the Books of Chronicles); (3) Sheshbazzar began the work and Zerubbabel finished it.

== In the Hebrew Bible ==
=== In the Prophets (Nevi'im) ===
Zerubbabel appears in the prophecies of Haggai and Zechariah.

==== The Prophecy of Haggai ====
"'On that day, says the Lord of Hosts, I will take you Zerubbabel, son of Shealtiel, my servant, and wear you like a signet ring; for it is you whom I have chosen. This is the word of the Lord of Hosts'" (Haggai 2:23).

This quotation from the Book of Haggai illustrates the messianic expectations that are often associated with Zerubbabel. The term, "my servant," describes Zerubbabel as God's servant. This term is often associated with King David. Walter Rose concludes that the fact that "the epithet 'servant' is hardly ever used for kings after David may be related to the fact that most of them were disappointing in their performance as kings appointed by YHVH". Rose emphasizes that the author of the Book of Haggai is associating Zerubbabel with King David.

Scholars have also analyzed the phrase "I will take you." Rose associates this term with a mission, change, or protection. For Zerubbabel, this mission was likely the rebuilding of the second Temple.

The most widely debated part of this prophecy is the phrase, "wear you like a signet ring." A signet ring is an authoritative symbol that is associated with power. Rose interprets this passage by comparing it to the passage in Jeremiah 22:24, in through which he concludes that the King is a signet ring on God's hand. John Kessler interprets the idea of the nature of the Signet ring as such that "the real true figure of speech at issue is a personification of which the simile or metaphor is only a part. The real trope consists of the personification of Yahweh, who is likened to the owner of a signet". However, this word when in Hebrew has been translated as meaning both seal and signet ring.

It is unclear whether Haggai's prophecy claims that Zerubbabel is going to be the King of the Land of Judah or if he is just to build the second Temple. Many scholars have interpreted the following passage from Haggai as identifying Zerubbabel as a king of the land of Judah, a continuation of the Davidic line:

"Zerubbabel is to be made either the representative of YHVH, or the new king who will restore the monarchy, or the new world leader. One sometimes finds words like messianic or Messiah used to describe Zerubbabel's role".

According to Peter Ackroyd, Zerubbabel was "'a royal representative of God'". Both historians' interpretations of the prophecy of Haggai appear to understand the term of the "signet ring" as being a metaphor for Zerubbabel attaining God's authority on earth.

Not all biblical scholars interpret Zerubbabel's authority in the same manner. Other scholars see it as a prophecy proclaiming that Zerubbabel will become king. According to Sara Japhet:

"Haggai does not explain, however, for what Zerubbabel was chosen. From what is described in the prophecy—the overthrow of the kingdoms of the nations as the first stage in the choosing of Zerubbabel—we may conclude that Haggai sees Zerubbabel as a king, whose kingdom is made possible by a change in the political structure. ... [F]rom now on, since Zerubbabel has been chosen as a 'signet,' he will be 'sitting on the throne of David and ruling again in Judah'. All this, however, is only hinted at in the prophecy of Haggai and not stated explicitly".

A. Lemaire interprets the author of Haggai as wanting Zerubbabel to be appointed to a lesser role:

"Haggai is expressing the hope of a change in status of the province of Yehud, and of Zerubbabel's emergence as a king of a vassal state within the Persian empire".

John Kessler's interpretation agrees with Lemaire's:

"The Promise of David…was now functioning in a new form, accommodated to the realities of the Persian period. Zerubbabel was not the ruler of a nation, but the governor of a province. Yet, such a provisional situation posed no inherent threat to the promise of the Davidic house".

Some historians claim that Haggai's prophecy does not claim that Zerubbabel will become the King of Judah. Rose's concludes that the imagery itself does not claim that Zerubbabel will be King of Judea. Rose also claims that "in Haggai's passage, one does not find a statement about Zerubbabel being YHVH's anointed, or about his autonomous rule (given by God), present or future, and there is no explicit promise that God will make the nations submit to his chosen one. One reads only about a mutual destruction of political and military forces masterminded by God. On the basis of these observations, I think it is safe to conclude that there is no reason to assume that divine intervention which does not mention autonomous rule or submission of the nations to Zerubbabel (Hag. 2) would necessarily imply a change of his position".

Furthermore, Rose makes this claim because the prophecy does not claim that Zerubbabel will become king:

"The absence of any reference to the Davidic line from which Zerubbabel came, and the failure to use words like "melech" ... (related to the title of King)...point in a different direction".

==== Zechariah ====
Falling in line with the rest of the twelve prophetic books of the Hebrew Bible (the Nevi'im), the book of Zechariah describes a hope for a future king, beyond the current leader Zerubbabel, and further establishes a portrayal of this future king. Anthony Petterson argues that the standard explanation of Haggai and Zechariah's prophecies, in which Zerubbabel was supposed to be the restorer of the Davidic dynasty but never fulfilled these expectations, does not actually stand as an explanation of the final form of these texts.

Zerubbabel's name is mentioned four times throughout Zechariah 1–8, and all of these instances occur in one short oracle written in chapter 4. Any other references to Zerubbabel throughout this book are guesses or theories as to his significance. Zechariah 4:1–3 gives a vision that was had by Zechariah of a lampstand with a bowl on it. Upon that are seven lamps, each with seven lips. There are two olive trees, one to the right of the bowl and one to the left. The explanation, told by the angel that Zechariah is conversing with, is as follows:

"This is the word of the Lord to Zerubbabel: 'Not by might nor by power, but by My Spirit,' says the Lord of hosts. 'Who are you, O great mountain? Before Zerubbabel you shall become a plain! And he shall bring forth the capstone with shouts of "Grace, grace to it!"' (Zech 4:6–7)

"The hands of Zerubbabel have laid the foundation of this house; his hands shall also complete it. … The seven are the eyes of the Lord, which range through the whole earth … the two olive trees … are the two sons of oil (anointed ones) who stand by the Lord of the whole earth." (Zech 4:9–14)

There is a debate in the biblical scholarly community as to who the "sons of oil" is referencing. Though conventional wisdom often understood it to be Zerubbabel and Joshua, Boda argues that, because of the important role that prophets were said to play in the reconstruction of the Temple in Zech 8:9, Haggai and Zechariah are the sons of oil.

The controversy regarding the prophesies about Zerubbabel relate back to this quote about Zerubbabel laying the foundation of the temple and eventually completing it. Zech 3:8 and 6:12 refer to a man called "The Branch." In Zechariah 6, the Lord tells Zechariah to gather silver and gold from the returned exiles (who had come back to Judah from Babylonia), and to go to the house of Josiah son of Zephaniah (members of the Davidic lineage). Then Zechariah is told to fashion a crown out of the silver and gold, set it on the head of Joshua son of Jehozadak, and tell him the following:

"Thus says the Lord of hosts: Here is a man whose name is Branch (Hebrew: Zemah): for he shall branch out in his place, and he shall build the temple of the Lord … he shall bear royal honor, and shall sit upon his throne and rule. There shall be a priest by his throne, with peaceful understanding between the two of them." (Zech 6:12–13)

It is unclear whether or not "the Branch" refers to Zerubbabel. Should this have been the intention of the author, then the restoration of the Davidic line of kings would be imminent, as Zerubbabel is a member of the line of David (1 Chron 3:19–20). There is some evidence for this link, namely that Zerubbabel was the governor of Judah at the time of Zechariah, he was frequently associated with Joshua (Ezra 3:2, 3:8), and he is also described as the Temple builder (Zech 4:9). However, there are several reasons that complicate this association. The first is that Joshua is the one crowned, not the Branch. The next is that Zerubbabel is not mentioned. The third is that the references to Zemah appear to anticipate a future event, while Zerubbabel existed in the present. Zechariah neither proclaims that Zerubbabel will restore the monarchy, nor does he contradict the previous hopes for a Davidic king (Hag 2:23). Rather, Zechariah maintains hope for a Davidic king in the future, without tying down the prophecy directly to Zerubbabel.

=== In the Writings (Kethuvim) ===
==== Ezra ====
According to the Book of Ezra chapter 2, Zerubbabel returned to Jerusalem in the first wave of liberated exiles under the decree of King Cyrus of Persia in 538 BC. The mention of Zerubbabel in the book of Ezra primarily serves the purpose of describing the return to Judah following the exile from Babylon and the construction of the Second Temple. According to the authors of the Book of Ezra, "when the seventh month came… Jeshua son of Jozadak along with his fellow-priests, and Zerubbabel son of Shealtiel, with his colleagues, set to work to build the altar of the God of Israel". (Ezra 3:1–2)

The Book of Ezra also gives a date for the beginning of the construction of the Temple:

"In the second month of the second year, after they came to the house of God in Jerusalem, Zerubbabel son of Shealtiel and Jeshua son of Jozadak began the work".(Ezr. 3:8)

This passage describes how Zerubbabel was part of the group who began to build the second Temple of Jerusalem. According to the Book of Ezra, Zerubbabel is also under the authority of King Cyrus of Persia to build the Temple (Ezr. 4:3). The passages describing Zerubbabel do mention the prophecies of Haggai and of Zechariah concerning Zerubbabel's actions in the land of Judah.

Regarding Sheshbazzar, he is frequently considered to have been appointed governor of Judah by the Persian King Cyrus in the year 538 BC, although an argument has been made that he was the last Neo-Babylonian governor of Yehud at the time of the Persian invasion. He was given gold and told to return to Jerusalem to rebuild the Temple. According to a letter from Tattenai (the governor of the province Beyond the River) to King Darius I, Sheshbazzar started the Temple, but it lay under construction for a long time (Ezra 5:16). It seems as though Zerubbabel picked up construction shortly afterwards, in the 2nd year of Darius' rule (August 29, 520 BC) (see Zerubbabel in Haggai).

According to the Letter written by King Darius I recorded in the Book of Ezra:

"the gold and silver vessels of the house of God, which Nebuchadnezzar carried away from the temple in Jerusalem and brought to Babylon, are to be returned; they are all to be taken back to the temple in Jerusalem, and restored each to its place in the house of God". (Ezr. 6:5)

The final detail in the book of Ezra regarding Zerubbabel is a date for the completion of the second Temple. According to the Book of Ezra, "the house was completed on the third day of the month of Adar, in the sixth year of the reign of King Darius." In this passage, the word "house" refers to the second Temple.

==== Nehemiah ====
The reference to Zerubbabel in the Book of Nehemiah is rather brief. The author of the Book of Nehemiah only refers to Zerubbabel in passing when the author states that: "These are the priests and the Levites which came back with Zerubbabel son of Shealtiel and with Jeshua" (Neh. 12:1). The Book of Nehemiah provides no new information regarding Zerubbabel; however, Nehemiah came to Jerusalem around 444 BC, almost a century later than Zerubbabel, so that is not so surprising.

==== 1st Chronicles ====
The mention of Zerubbabel in 1 Chronicles only states Zerubbabel and his lineage and descendants. The Masoretic Text of the passage states:

"The sons of Pedaiah: Zerubbabel and Shimei. The sons of Zerubbabel: Meshullam and Hannaniah; they had a sister Shelomith. There were five others: Hashubah, Ohel, Berechiah, Hasadiah, and Jushab-hesed" (1 Chronicles 3:19).

Unlike the passages in Nehemiah, Haggai, and Ezra, the Masoretic text of 1 Chronicles appears to state that Zerubbabel is not the son of Shealtiel, but rather the son of Pedaiah. However, in the Septuagint text of 1 Chronicles, Zerubbabel is said to be the son of Shealtiel, in agreement with all other accounts.

=== Son of Shealtiel or Pedaiah ===
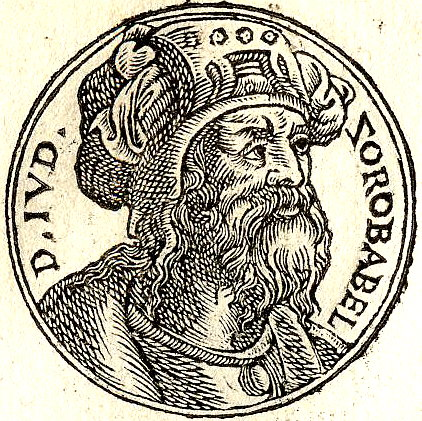
Zerubbabel from Guillaume Rouillé's Promptuarii Iconum Insigniorum (1553)

The Hebrew Bible has conflicting texts regarding whether Zerubbabel is the son of Shealtiel or of Pedaiah. Several texts (that are thought to be more or less contemporaneous) explicitly call "Zerubbabel the son of Shealtiel" (Ezra 3:2,8;5:2, Nehemiah 12:1, Haggai 1:1,12,14). In addition, the genealogy given in the Septuagint text of 1 Chronicles supports that position, as does the Seder Olam Zutta. In contrast, the Masoretic Text of 1 Chronicles 3:17–19 makes Zerubbabel a nephew of Shealtiel: King Jeconiah is the father of Shealtiel and Pedaiah, then Pedaiah is the father of Zerubbabel.

The text which identifies Zerubbabel as a son of Pedaiah could be a scribal error. It occurs in a part of the text where the Hebrew seems incongruent and possibly garbled (1 Chronicles 3:16–21). The expected mention of Shealtiel being a father seems accidentally omitted, and thus his children became confused with Pedaiah's. There may be other problems with these verses as well.

In any case, those texts that call Zerubbabel "son of Shealtiel" have a context that is overtly political and seems to emphasize Zerubbabel's potential royal claim to the throne of the Davidic Dynasty by being Shealtiel's successor. Zerubbabel is understood as the legal successor of Shealtiel, with Zerubbabel's title paralleling the High Priest Jeshua's title, "son of Jozadak", that emphasizes Joshua's rightful claim to the dynasty of high priests, descending from Aaron. Therefore, with one descending from David and the other from Aaron, these two officials have the divine authority to rebuild the Temple.

== In the New Testament ==
In the New Testament, the name Zerubbabel appears in both versions of the genealogy of Jesus.

- In Matthew's genealogy from Solomon: "Jechoniah was the father of Shealtiel, and Shealtiel the father of Zerubbabel, and Zerubbabel the father of Abiud". (Matthew 1:12–13),
- In Luke's genealogy from Nathan (son of David) there is also a "Zerubbabel son of Salatiel" (different spelling from Matthew), but this Zerubbabel is grandson of Neri, not Jeconiah, and his son is Rhesa not Abiud. (Luke 3:27).

Matthew's genealogy matches the genealogy presented in the Septuagint text of 1 Chronicles, although the Masoretic Text of 1 Chronicles replaces Shealtiel with his brother Pedaiah (another son of Jechoniah). Luke's genealogy differs from these completely after David, except for the mention of a Shealtiel and his son, Zerubbabel. Various explanations have been suggested for this divergence, with one common explanation being that Luke traces the genealogy of Jesus through Mary, in recognition of the virgin birth.

== In Apocrypha ==
=== Sirach ===
"How shall we magnify Zerubbabel? He was like a signet ring on the right hand" (Sirach 49:13)

Zerubbabel is listed alongside Jeshua (Joshua) son of Jozadak and Nehemiah as a leader of the restoration of the Temple. Notably, Ezra is missing from this honor. This portion of the text of Sirach is a list and brief description of the famous rulers, prophets, and ancestors of the kingdom of Judah (beginning in chapter 44).

=== 1st Esdras ===
1 Esdras 3–4 tells the story of a speech-writing competition between three bodyguards of Darius I known as the Tale of the Three Guardsmen or the Darius contest, in which the winner would receive honor and riches from the King. In turn, the three guardsmen nominate wine, the king, and women and truth, as "the strongest". Zerubbabel's statement, that women and truth are the strongest, proves to be the one which Darius prefers. Scholars have long debated the source of the competition and the Praise of Truth. Cook says that the competition story could be either "a secondary insertion or part of the original compilation". The argument for wine conflicts with Proverbs 23:29–35 and Sirach 31:.25–30. Cook mentions other views of the Praise of Truth: "may be a specimen of Palestinian wisdom (Zunz), and although Volz (1493) thinks it shows contact with Alexandrian religious philosophy, Torrey (46 seq.) fails to find anything 'hellenistic' or suggestive of the influence of Greek literature or philosophy".

Torrey (1910) disagrees with German critics: "But if any student of the Greek Bible will look closely at the idiom of these two chapters, he will find it precisely the same which elsewhere results from a close rendering of a Hebrew or Aramaic original. … All those who are familiar with Semitic modes of thought and literary forms will recognize here a characteristic Semitic product". Dancy (2001) supports Torrey: "And the praise of truth is clearly an insertion (4.34–41). It differs totally from the other three in being not a courtly speech but a lofty hymn. In particular, Egyption Ma'at and Persian Arsha were deities of order, representing both truth and (as here) justice. The hymn is unlikely to be Jewish in origin, otherwise the praise would have been of Wisdom, but its elevated tone clearly appealed to the Jewish editor."

The first two spoke about the strength of wine and the strength of kings, respectively, but the winner was the third bodyguard, who spoke about the strength of women and truth:

"If she smiles at him, he laughs; if she loses her temper with him, he flatters her so that she may be reconciled with him. Gentlemen, why are not women strong, since they do such things?" (1 Esdras 4:31–32).

This speaker is told (in parentheses) to be Zerubbabel, but this detail was likely tacked onto a secular, Hellenized tale about the power of wine, kings, truth, and women. The author of 1 Esdras might have done so to glorify the power of Zerubbabel, the description of which is unparalleled in Ezra, Nehemiah, and Haggai, as the aforementioned books all discuss the power of Zerubbabel in accordance to the power of the high priest Joshua. After Zerubbabel wins the competition, he is given sanction to rebuild the Temple and return the sacred Temple vessels that Nebuchadnezzar II had preserved after the conquest of Babylon.

It is also probable that the author of 1 Esdras included this reference to Zerubbabel to alleviate any confusion about the difference between Zerubbabel and Sheshbazzar that was apparent in the original book of Ezra.

The account of Zerubbabel in 1 Esdras is almost identical to the account of Zerubbabel in the Book of Ezra, included in the Kethuvim. This is because many scholars believe that 1 Esdras is a Greek version of the Book of Ezra. However, there are a few details that appear in 1 Esdras and not in the Book of Ezra. The first discrepancy is that 1 Esdras refers to Zerubbabel's son as Joakim (1 Esdras 5:5). However, this is not one of the sons included in the genealogy included in 1 Chronicles and the Book of Ezra makes no mention of Zerubbabel's son.

The second discrepancy is that the author of 1 Esdras claims that it was "Zerubbabel who spoke wise words before King Darius of Persia" (1 Esdras 5:6). However, there is no passage similar to this in the Book of Ezra. Finally 1 Esdras mentions a person called Sanabassar as the Governor of Judah and that it was he who laid the foundation for the first temple (1 Esdras 6:18–20). Sanabassar may refer to Shashbazar. According to the Book of Ezra, Shashbazar was a governor of Judah (Ezra 5:14) who receives credit for laying the temple's foundation (Ezra 5:15). The difference in the names is likely due to the rendering of the Hebrew name in Greek.

== Zorobabel and the Darius contest in other texts ==
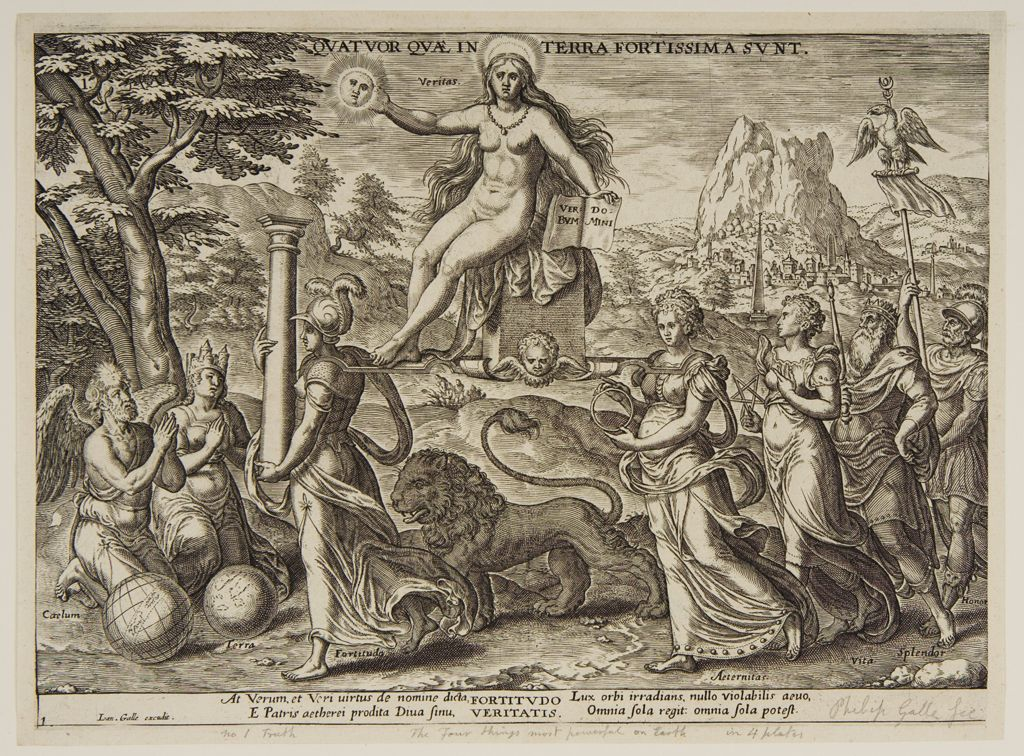
Praise of Truth by Phillips Galle after Gerard Groenning 1638.

Alcuin Blamires has found five authors who tell the tale of a contest to identify what is the strongest thing. According to Blamires these tales represent "the nearest discoverable counterpart to Theophrastus/Jerome's influence on medieval misogyny." In chronological order they are:

1. 1 Esdras (cited as Vulgate or 3 Esdras by Blamires)
2. Josephus, c. 94, Antiquities of the Jews
3. Nicholas Bozon, c. 1320, Contes moralisés
4. Jean Le Fèvre de Ressons (1320–1380), "Livre de Leesce"
5. John Gower, 1390, Confessio Amantis VII. lines 1802–1975
6. Lope De Vega, c. 1638, "Contra valor no hay desdicha" lines 452–495
7. Mary Collier, 1730, The Three Wise Sentences

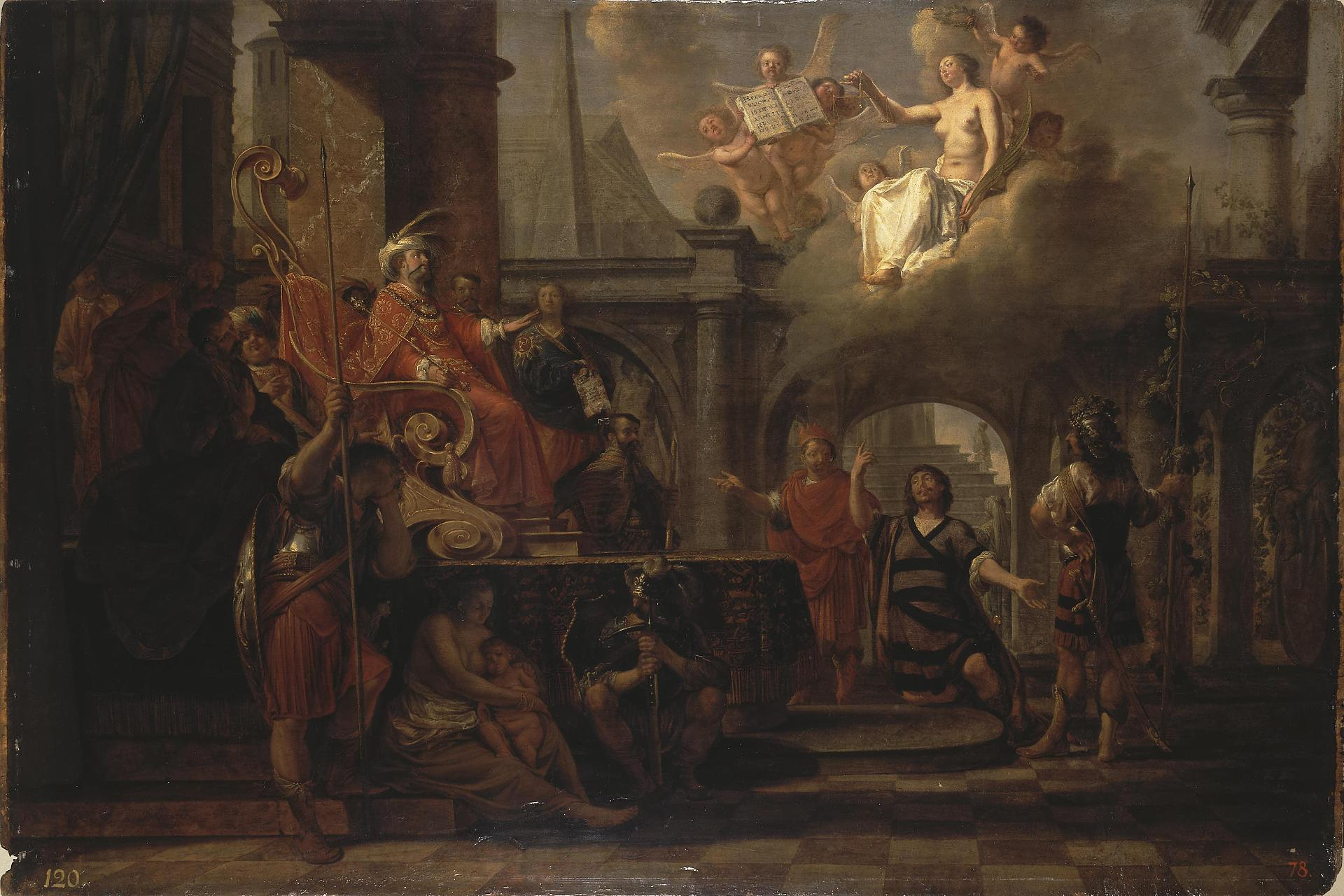
Zerubbabel Before Darius by Nikolaus Knüpfer, Hermitage Museum.

Five versions pick truth as strongest after discussing the merits of women. Bozon's omission of the "Esdras sequel on truth" was either deliberate or "not available in the account he is following. Le Fèvre "makes Zorobabel a fourth speaker, championing truth after the other three nominations have been aired by three preceding speakers". Lope De Vega also ignores truth. Walker observes that De Vega used several historical sources in addition to 1 Esdras. Four versions (Esdras, Josephus, Gower and Collier) mention the courtesan Apame who took the crown of Darius in Esdras and Josephus (in Gower Apemen is courtesan of Cyrus). Collier follows Esdras fairly closely and "ends with a pious expression of the poet's submission to divine will:".

The contest inspired six sixteenth century artists to create prints illustrating the four powers. Veldman has located works by Philips Galle, Johannes Wierix, Pieter Perret, Zacharias Dolendo, Nicolaus Knüpfer and Christoffel van Sichem. The last work dates from 1657. The disappearance of 1 Esdras from the Dutch bible "would certainly have contributed to the sudden decline in the riddle's popularity".

Many authors consider "truth" to be the core of this story. Some modern critics view "women" as the focus as they were often belittled in biblical and medieval texts. Milton disagrees with Zorobabel and asserts that "truth and justice are all one".

== In Freemasonry ==
Although he is not mentioned in Craft Freemasonry, Zerubbabel is considered to be of great importance to a number of Masonic bodies. Within Holy Royal Arch freemasonry and Scottish Rite Freemasonry he is considered to be a ruling principal.

== In other texts ==
He is the receiver of an apocalypse in the seventh-century Apocalypse of Zerubbabel, also known as Sefer Zerubbabel. This text contains a prophecy given to Zerubbabel from God. It is very similar to the style of the prophecy given in 1 Enoch. The prophecy contains messianic imagery and Zerubbabel is told the future of the city of Jerusalem.

He plays a large role in Sholem Asch's final work The Prophet. He is announced as the Prince of Judah upon his return to the Holy Land. One of the firm and long-standing followers and friends of the Prophet Isaiah, and descendant of the Davidic Dynasty.

== Notes ==
Zerubbabel House of David Cadet branch of the Tribe of Judah
Preceded by Shealtiel	Leader of the House of David	Line lost
Preceded by Sheshbazzar	Governor of Judah	Elnathan
Preceded by Shealtiel	Prince of Judah	Succeeded by Meshullam
Preceded by Shealtiel	Matthew's Ancestry of Jesus – 11th ancestor from Jesus	Succeeded by Abiud
Preceded by Shealtiel	Luke's Ancestry of Jesus – 20th ancestor from Jesus	Succeeded by Rhesa
