= Ary de Vois =

Dutch painter

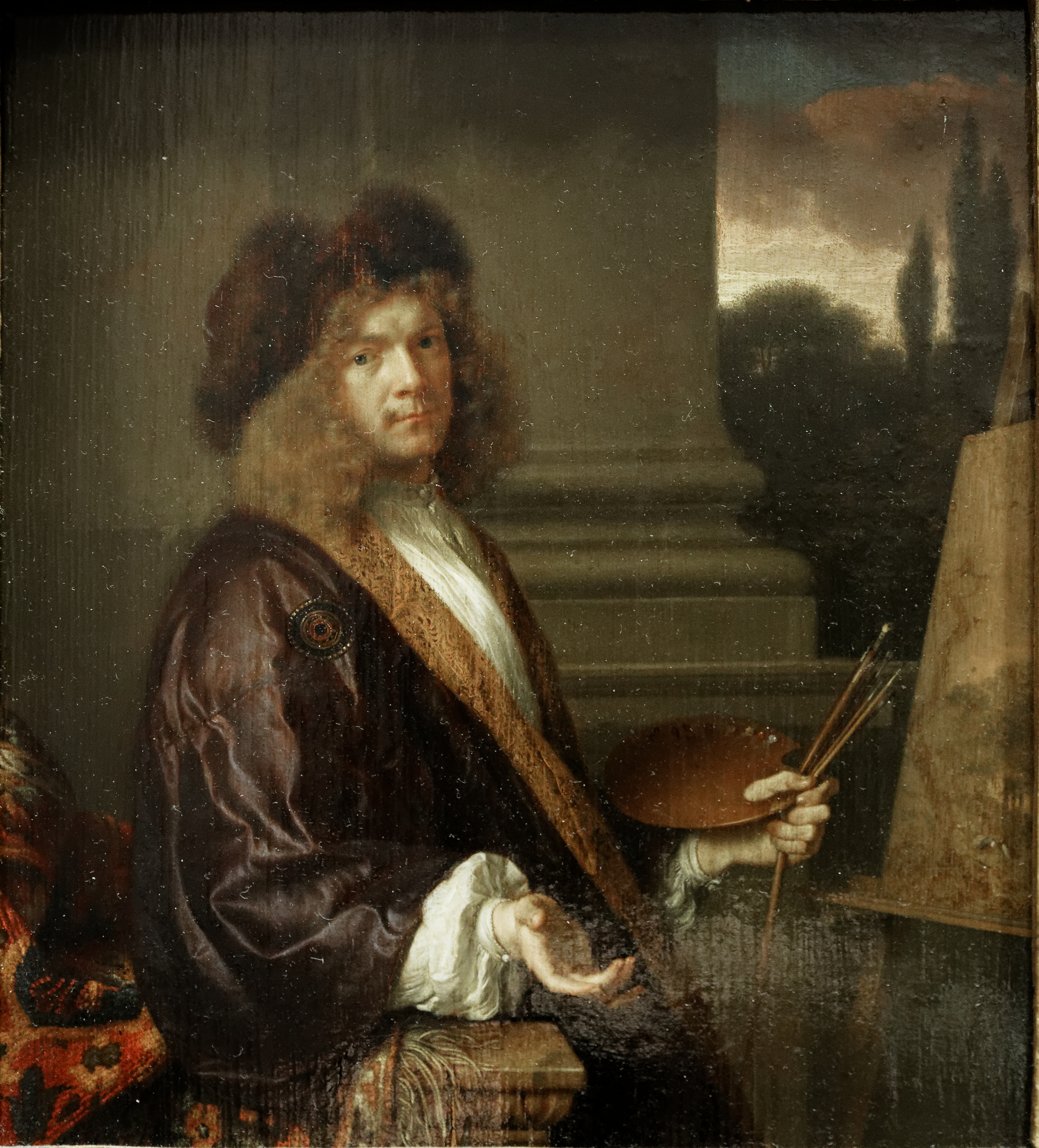
Self-portrait, 1673

Ary de Vois (1632-1635 – July 1680) was a Dutch Golden Age painter.

== Biography ==
Ary de Vois was born and died in Leiden. He was the son of Alewijn de Vois from Utrecht, who was organist in the Pieterskerk, Leiden, in 1635. Ary became a pupil in Utrecht of Nikolaus Knüpfer, who also taught Jan Steen. Ary then returned to Leiden to study with Abraham van den Tempel, who lived there between 1648 and 1660. De Vois joined the Leiden Guild of St Luke on 16 October 1653, paying dues until 1677. He was dean in 1662-64, headman in 1664-65 and dean again from 1667-68. He married Maria van der Vecht, on 5 February 1656.

According to Houbraken his marriage caused a lull in his production, especially when he moved to Warmond where he took up fishing as a hobby. He had to move back to Leiden in order to keep his production levels high.
