= Meshullam =

Male given name

Meshullam is a Hebrew biblical masculine name meaning "Befriended". It is appear in bible several times and refer to individual for their loyalty.

In the Hebrew Bible, the name Meshullam was borne by eleven characters:

1. One of the chief Gadites in Bashan during the time of Jotham (1 Chronicles 5:13).
2. Grandfather of Shaphan, "the scribe", in the reign of Josiah (2 Kings 22:3).
3. A priest, father of Hilkiah (1 Chronicles 9:11),(Nehemiah 11:11), in the reign of Ammon; called Shallum in (1 Chronicles 6:12).
4. A Levite of the family of Kohath (2 Chronicles 34:12), in the reign of Josiah.
5. A son of Elpaal. (1 Chronicles 8:17).
6. One of two sons of Zerubbabel, the other being Hananiah. (1 Chronicles 3:19)
7. A priest, head of the House of Ezra. (Nehemiah 12:13).
8. A chief priest (Nehemiah 12:16).
9. One of the leading Levites in the time of Ezra (Ezra 8:16).
10. A priest (1 Chronicles 9:12).
11. One of the principal Israelites who supported Ezra when expounding the law to the people (Nehemiah 8:4).

== See also ==
- List of minor biblical figures, L–Z

== List of people with the name Meshullam ==
- Israel Meshullam Solomon (1723–1794), born as Israel Meshullam Zalman Emden in Altona near Hamburg, Chief Rabbi of the United Kingdom and rabbi of the Hambro Synagogue
- Meshullam Feivush Heller of Zbarazh (c.1742–1794), author of several Hasidic sefarim including the Yosher Divrei Emes
- Meshulam Fayish Tzvi (Herman) Gross or Grosz (1863–1947), businessman, inventor, learned layman, and author
- Meshullam Phoebus ben Israel Samuel (c. 1547–1617), Polish rabbi
- Meshullam HaKohen ben Ya'akov, also known as Rabbeinu Meshullam haGodol (Rabbi Meshullam the Great), Franco-Jewish Talmudist of the twelfth century CE
- Moshe Meshullam Halevy Horowitz (1832–1894), Galician rabbi
- Yerucham ben Meshullam (1290–1350), prominent rabbi and posek during the period of the Rishonim
