= Zechariah (Hebrew prophet) =

Biblical prophet

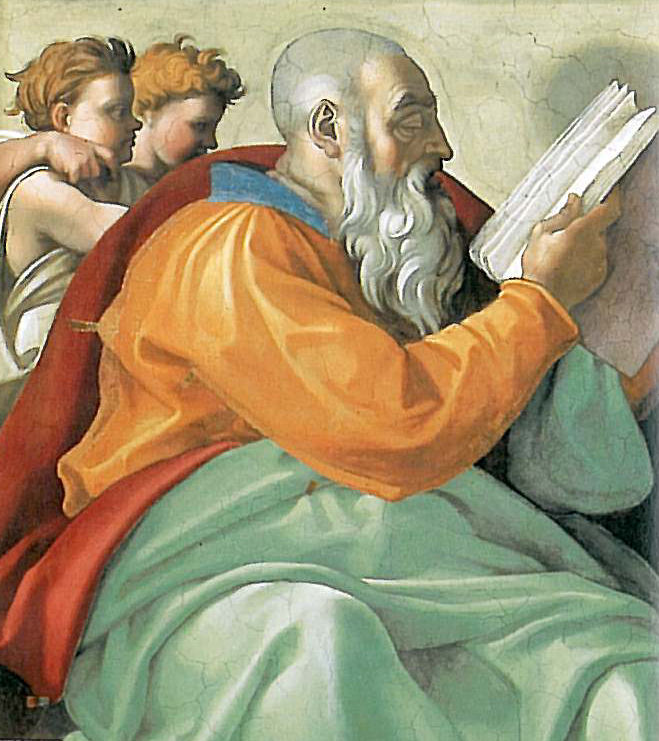
- Zechariah as depicted on the ceiling of the Sistine Chapel
- Died: c. 6th century BCE
- Occupation: Prophet
- Known for: Author of the Book of Zechariah
- Father: Berechiah (likely)

Zechariah (/zɛkəˈraɪ.ə/; Hebrew: זְכַרְיָה, romanized: Zəḵaryā; Arabic: زكريا, romanized: Zakaryā; Biblical Greek: Ζαχαρίας Latin: Zacharias) was a person in the Hebrew Bible traditionally considered the author of the Book of Zechariah, the eleventh of the Twelve Minor Prophets.

Zechariah 1:1 depicts the eponymous character as the son of Berechiah, the son of Iddo. The Book of Ezra instead names Zechariah as the son of Iddo, Targum Lamentations 2:20 names this Zechariah as a son of Iddo, as does the book of Matthew 23:35. This is not the same person as Iddo the Seer, who lived during the reigns of Solomon, Rehoboam, and Abijah, and is most likely the Iddo mentioned in Ezra 8:17.

Zechariah's prophetical career probably began in the second regnal year of Darius the Great, king of the Achaemenid Empire (520 BCE). Zechariah's greatest concern appears to have been with the building of the Second Temple. He features in chapters 1–8 of the book of Zechariah but he does not appear in the remaining chapters of the book (chapters 9–14).

== Prophet ==
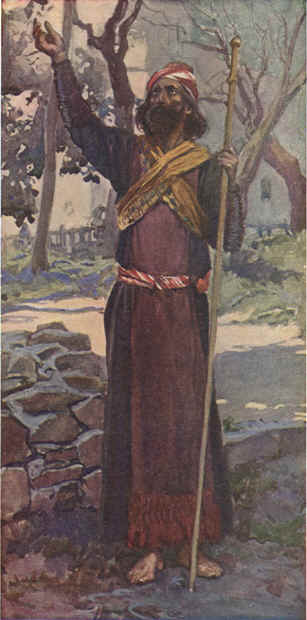
Zechariah as depicted by James Tissot

The Book of Zechariah introduces him as the son of Berechiah, the son of Iddo. The Book of Nehemiah identifies him as a Levitical priest. The Book of Ezra names Zechariah as the son of Iddo, but it is likely that Berechiah was Zechariah's father and Iddo his grandfather, a common use of "son" in biblical texts. Targum Lamentations 2:20 also names this Zechariah "son of Iddo". This Iddo is not the same person as Iddo the Seer, who lived during the reigns of Solomon, Rehoboam, and Abijah, but is the Iddo mentioned in Nehemiah 12:4,16, a priest who returned from the Exile with Zerubbabel and Joshua. Zechariah's name means "Yah remembers".

Zechariah's prophetical career probably began in the second year of Darius the Great, king of the Achaemenid Empire (520 BCE). His greatest concern appears to have been with the building of the Second Temple. He features in chapters 1–8 of the book of Zechariah but he does not appear in the remaining chapters of the book (chapters 9–14).

== Liturgical commemoration ==
On the Eastern Orthodox liturgical calendar, his feast day is 8 February. He is commemorated in the calendar of saints of the Armenian Apostolic Church on the Tuesday after the fifth Sunday of Pentecost and, with the other Minor Prophets, on 31 July. The Catholic Church honors him with a feast day assigned to 6 September.

== See also ==
- Tomb of the Prophets
- Zechariah (given name) for the derivation and translations of his name
- Zechariah, father of John the Baptist, in the New Testament
