= Ohel (biblical figure) =

Ohel (Hebrew: אהל, אוהל, "tent" or "house") is the name of the fourth son of Zerubbabel. His name is mentioned in 1 Chronicles 3:20.
