= Nikolaus Knüpfer =

German-born Dutch painter (1609–1655)

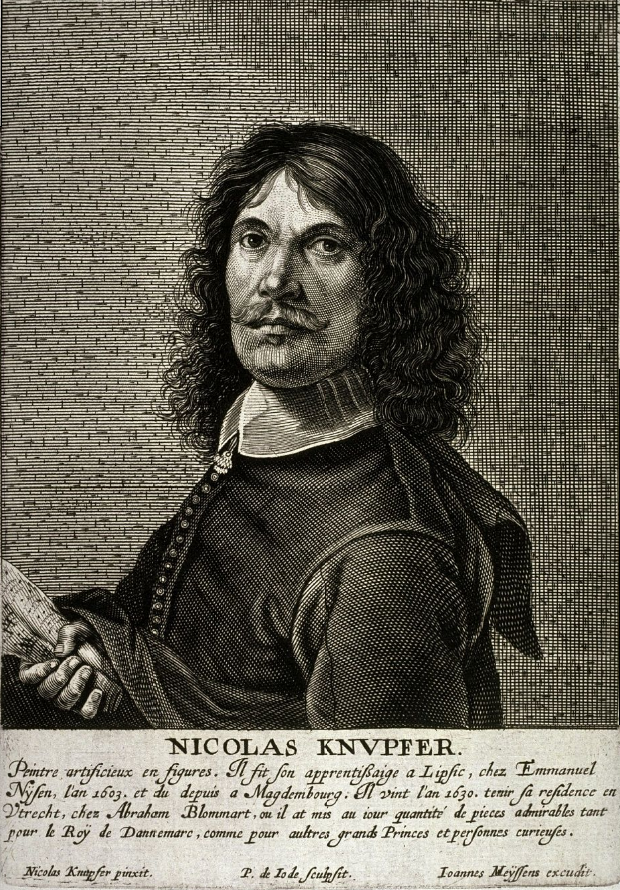
- Nicolaes Knupfer's self-portrait, engraved by Pieter de Jode II for Het Gulden Cabinet p 115
- Born: Nicolaes; 1609; Leipzig
- Died: 1655 (aged 45–46); Utrecht
- Known for: Painting
- Movement: Baroque

Nikolaus Knüpfer (1609 – 15 October 1655) was a Dutch Golden Age painter.

== Biography ==
Knüpfer was born and trained in Leipzig, where according to Houbraken he was apprenticed to Emanuel Nysen. He then moved to Magdeburg where he found work making brushes for artists. He stayed there until 1630, and then moved to Utrecht to work with Abraham Bloemaert. He lived with him for two years and then established his own studio in Utrecht, where in 1637 he became a visiting member of the Guild of St. Luke. He worked on the decorations of the castle Kronborg in Denmark, and painted figures in the landscapes of Jan Both and Jan Baptist Weenix. Knüpfer was a successful teacher, whose students were great painters after him, such as Jan Steen, Gabriel Metsu, Ary de Vois, and Pieter Crijnse Volmarijn.

== Work ==
Knüpfer painted small scale paintings with biblical, literary, and mythological themes, in addition to the popular genre works of his day. His figures are often in unusual poses, and painted with flowing lines with white accents.

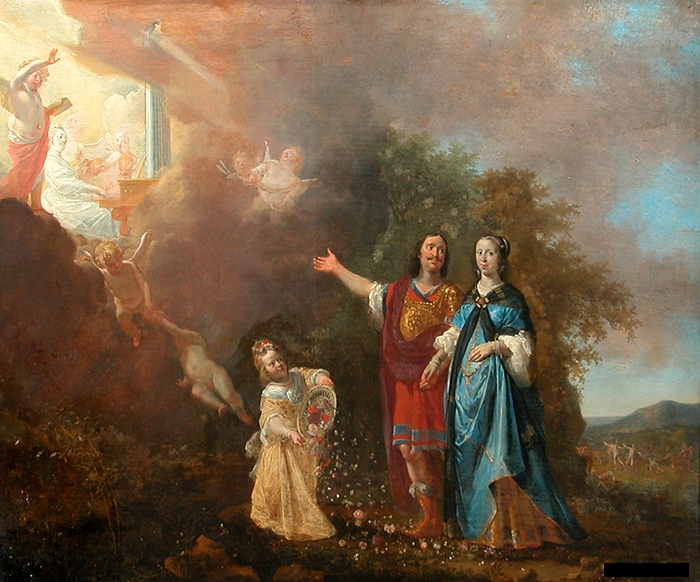
Couple portrayed with children both alive and dead.

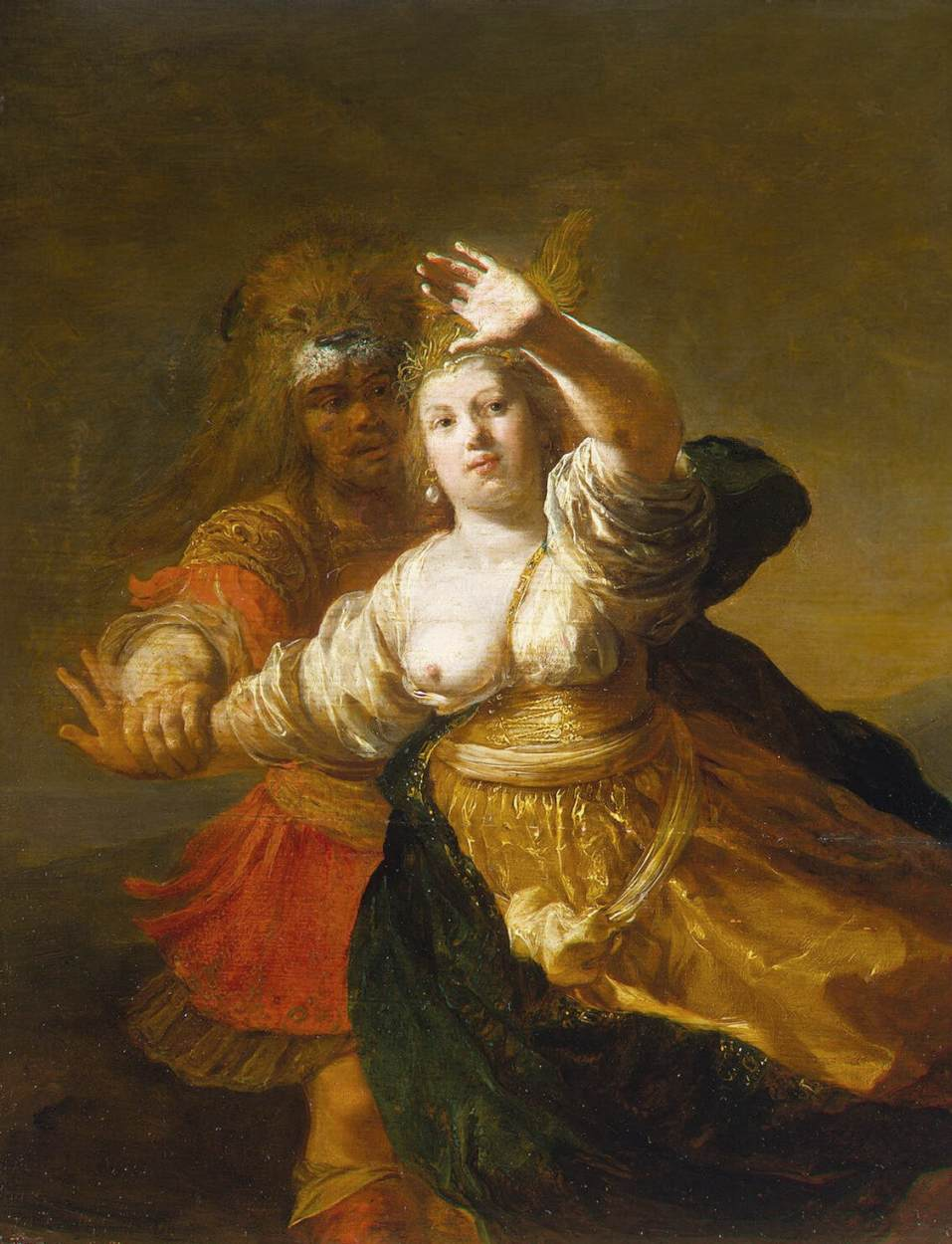
Hercules Obtaining the Girdle of Hyppolita

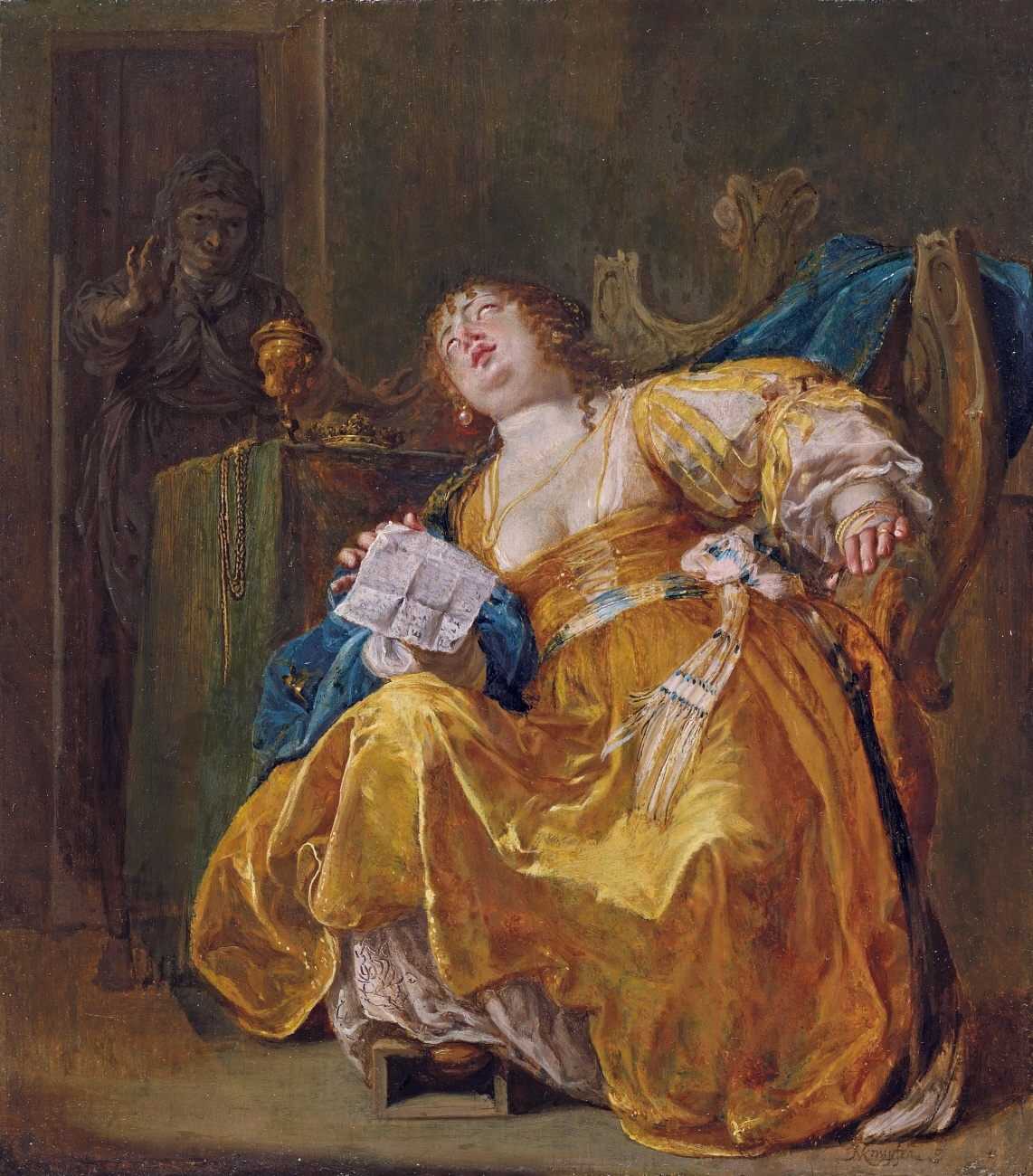
Sophonisba, by 1635

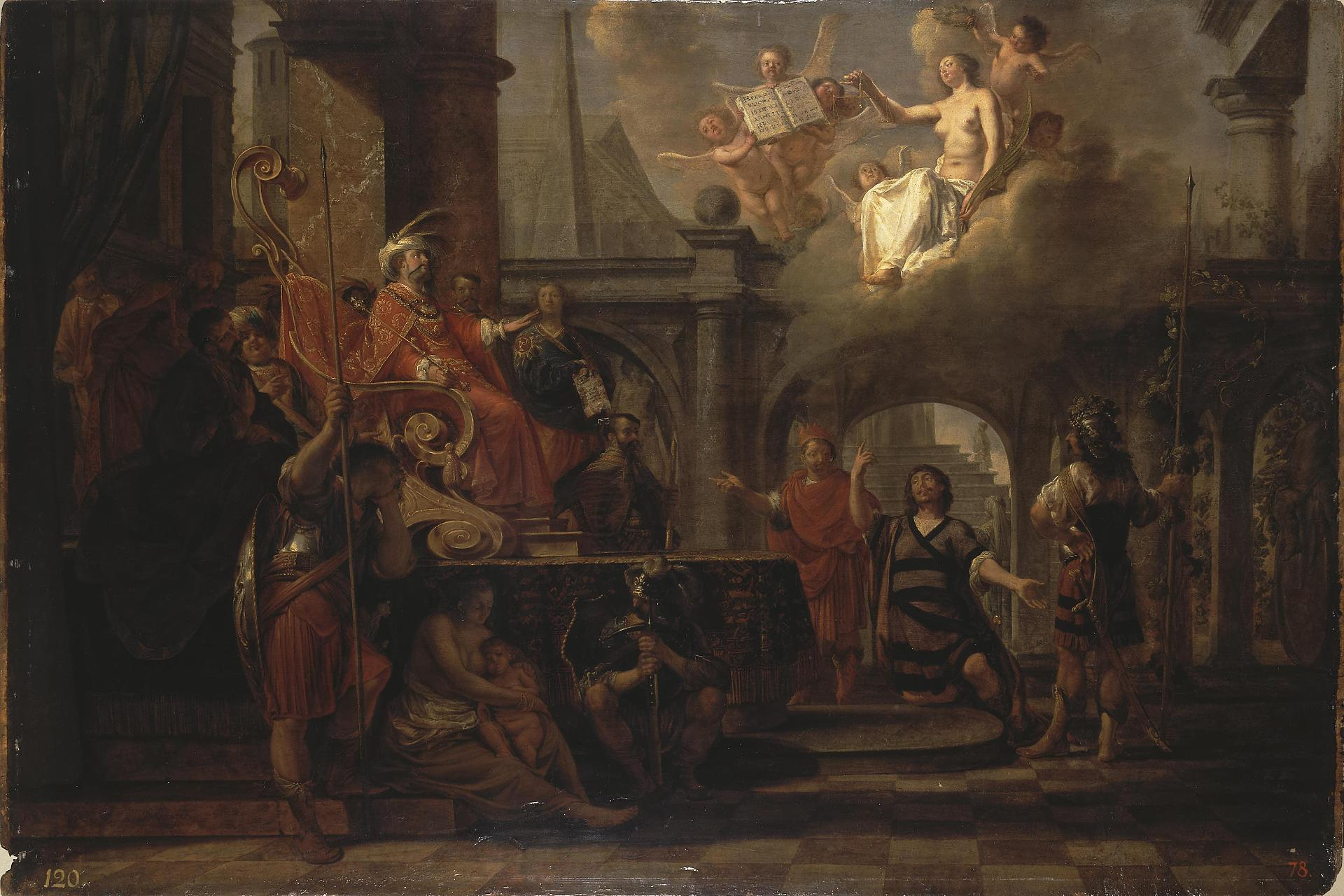
Zerubbabel Before Darius, after 1644

== Master-pupil interpretations of the Book of Tobit ==
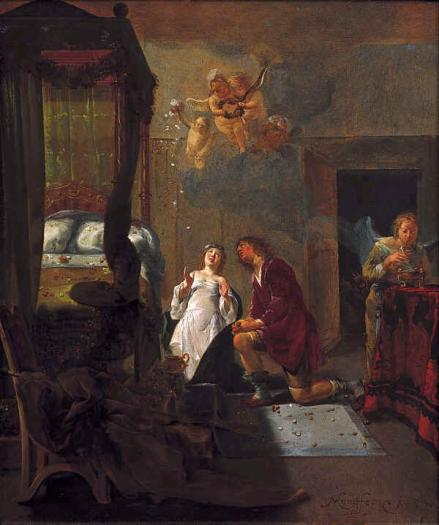
Knupfer's scene from the Book of Tobit where Tobias and Sarah pray while the Angel Raphaël drives away the demon.

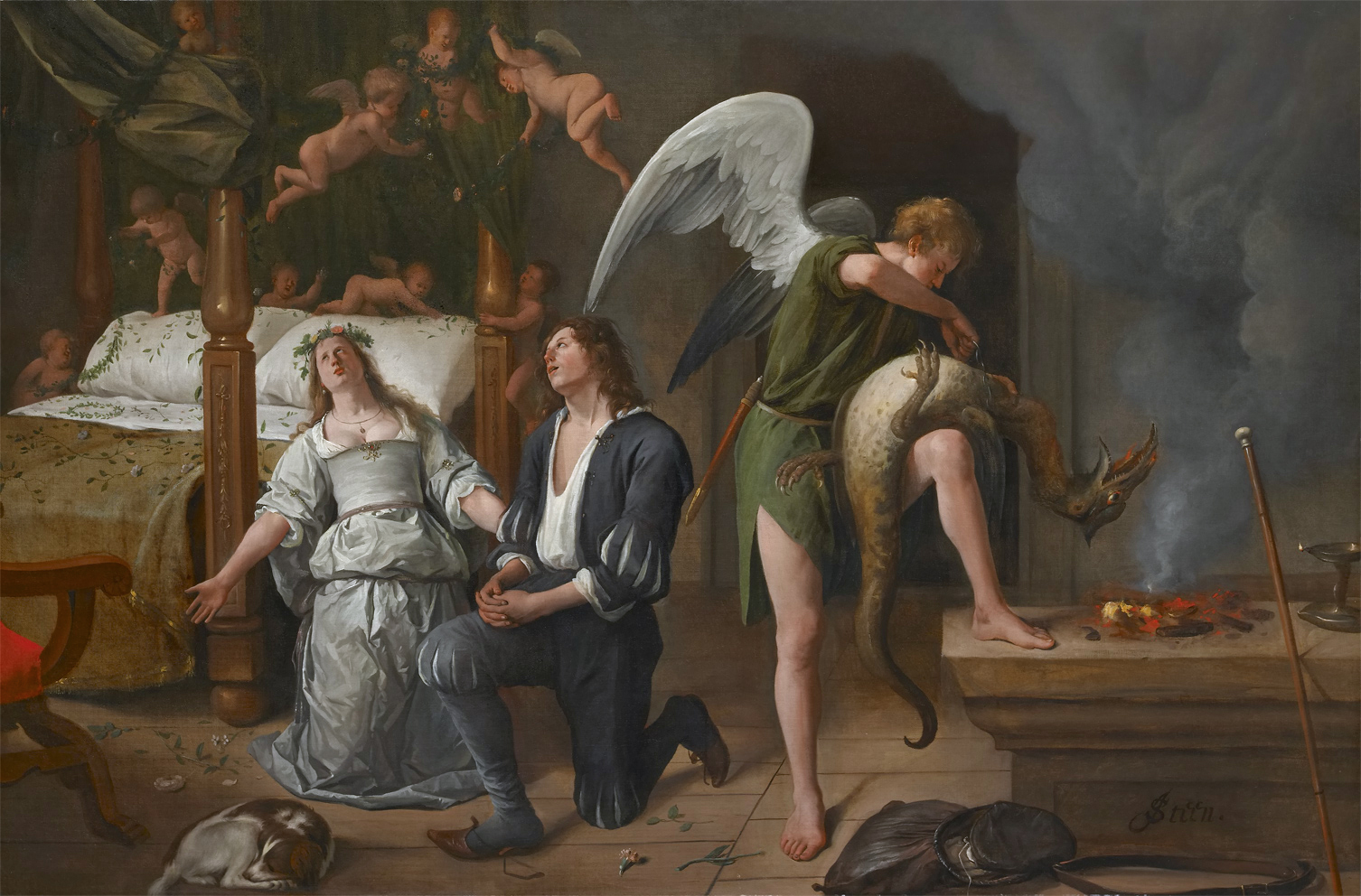
Same scene several years later by his pupil Jan Steen, Museum Bredius.
