= Berechiah Berak ben Isaac Eisik Shapira =

Galician preacher

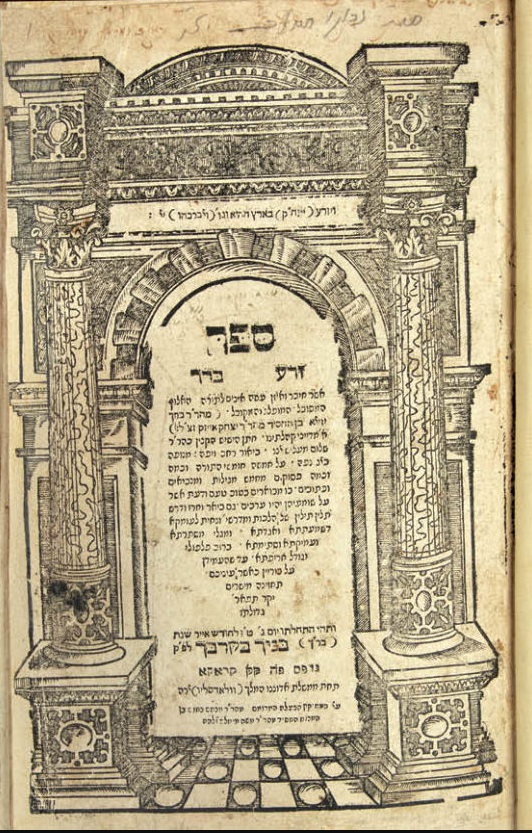
The cover page of "זרע ברך" 1646

Berechiah Berak ben Isaac Eisik Shapira (died 1664) was a Galician preacher who was educated by Nathan Shapira, rabbi of Kraków, and was appointed preacher of that city, where he spent most of his life. He ultimately left for Jerusalem, but died en route at Constantinople.

His sermons on the Pentateuch, the Megillot, and the Passover Haggadah were collected and published in two volumes under the title, Zerah Berak. The first was published in 1646 at Kraków. Appended to it was Aṭeret Ẓebi, by Ẓebi Hirsch ben Shalom Mebo, the brother-in-law of Berechiah and son-in-law of Yom Tov Lipmann Heller. The second volume was published, together with a second edition of the first one, in 1662, and itself went into a second edition, Amsterdam, 1730.

== Jewish Encyclopedia bibliography ==
- Michael, Heimann Joseph, (1891) Or ha-Ḥayyim, Frankfort-on-the-Main (in Hebrew), No. 646.
