= Targum Lamentations =

The Targum of Lamentations (TgLam) is an Aramaic rendering of the biblical Book of Lamentations. Like all other targumim, TgLam includes both an Aramaic translation and rabbinic commentary. The targum is a literary unit with one author and dates to the 5th–6th centuries CE.

== Date and provenance ==
The targum, written in Galilean Aramaic, must have come from Galilee (northern Israel). The work was written in a learned rabbinic environment and written for a popular audience. It advocates rabbinic values and is similar to Lamentations Rabbah (5th century).

The targum dates to 5th or early 6th century. The targum is pre-Islamic: it addresses a world dominated by the Roman and Persian world superpowers, placing it before the Muslim conquests of the early seventh century, which brought an end to the Persian Empire. It was written in Galilean Aramaic, a dialect not used in Islamic times. It knows of Constantinople as the capital of the Roman Empire, placing it after 324 CE, which is when Constantinople became the capital. The targum also knows of the city of Rome as a second, contemporary, flourishing, and prosperous capital of the empire. However, the city of Rome was thoroughly in the fifth century: by the Sack of Rome by the Visigots (410), the Sack of Rome by the Vandals (455), and the ultimate capture of Rome by the "barbarian" Odoacer in 476, causing the Fall of the Western Roman Empire. The authors representation of Rome, in his own time, as a prosperous city of the Romans, then, could not date very long after these events. At the very most, the text could be written soon after 500 CE (early sixth century).

== Citations and manuscripts ==
The earliest citation of TgLam appears in the 7th century, in the tractate Soferim (42b), referencing it when discussing the liturgical worship of Tisha b’Av. Manuscripts of TgLam fall into two families: the Western text and the Yemenite text. The earliest manuscript is Codex Solger MS 1-7.2∫ (c. 1291 CE). TgLam's Aramaic mixes elements of eastern and western dialects. There are two primary textual traditions, that of western texts and those of Yemenite provenance.

== Content ==
The author of Targum Lamentations focused on the two destructions of the Temple of Jerusalem (in 586 BCE by the Babylonians, and then again in 70 CE by the Romans) and the passages in Lamentations that challenge God.

The first four verses of Lamentations are annotated with a long discussion about the sins of God's people, from the Fall of Man in the time of Adam and Eve, to the refusal of the People of Israel to observe the Day of Atonement. Later sections of Lamentations have much less commentary: the last three chapters are mostly the original text. Yet when additions are made, they speak either to the deservedness of Israel's punishment or calling Israel back to right worship of God.

The targumist's concern to demonstrate Israel's sin and rebellion against God responds to the biblical author's challenge to God's justice in allowing the destruction of Jerusalem and the death and suffering of so many. The targumist addresses this concern by following rabbinic interpretation of the destruction of Jerusalem, systematically demonstrating God's justice in punishing Israel, and showing that repentance and obedience to Torah will enable Israel to be received by God “perfected in the world to come.”

== Sources ==
- Alexander, Philip (2007). The Targum of Lamentations: Translated, with a Critical Introduction, Apparatus, and Notes. Liturgical Press.
- Brady, Christian M.M. “Targum Lamentations’ Reading of the Book of Lamentations” (1MB pdf), Doctoral Thesis, Oxford, 2000.
- Brady, Christian M.M. The Rabbinic Targum of Lamentations: Vindicating God (Leiden: Brill, 2003). ISBN 978-90-04-12163-8.
- McNamara, Martin (2010). Targum and Testament Revisited: Aramaic Paraphrases of the Hebrew Bible: A Light on the New Testament, Second Edition. Eerdmans.
- Sperber, A. The Bible in Aramaic, vol. IVa (Leiden: Brill, 1968). ISBN 978-90-04-14038-7.
- Brady's English translation of Targum Lamentations.
