= Tattenai =

Tattenai (or Tatnai or Sisinnes; Hebrew: תַּתְּנַי Tattǝnay; Akkadian: 𒋫𒀜𒄨𒉡 Tâttannu or 𒋺𒄨𒉡 Tattannu) was a biblical character named as the Persian governor of the province west of the Euphrates River during the time of Zerubbabel and the reign of Darius I.

In some English translations he was governor "on this side of the river"; other translations place his province "beyond the river".

In the biblical narrative he questions King Darius in regard to the rebuilding of a temple for the Lord, God of Israel. He was generally friendly to the Jews. The rebuilding was being led by Jeshua, son of Jozadak, and Zerubbabel, son of Shealtiel, and had been issued by King Cyrus I. Tattenai wrote a letter to King Darius to ask if these statements were true, and then King Darius wrote a letter confirming the statements. In the letter, Darius asked that the people do everything they can to support this rebuilding financially, and that they do nothing to impede it, lest they suffer harsh punishment.

== Babylonian Cuneiform inscriptions ==
A number of cuneiform tablets bearing the name Tattenai have survived as part of what may have been a family archive. The tablet that links one member of this family to the Bible character is a promissory note dated to the 20th year of Darius I, 502 BC. It identifies a witness to the transaction as a servant of “Tattannu, governor of Across-the-River”. The clay tablet can be dated to June 5, 502 B.C. exactly.

== See also ==
- List of biblical figures identified in extra-biblical sources
