= Supersessionism =

Christian doctrine concerning biblical covenants

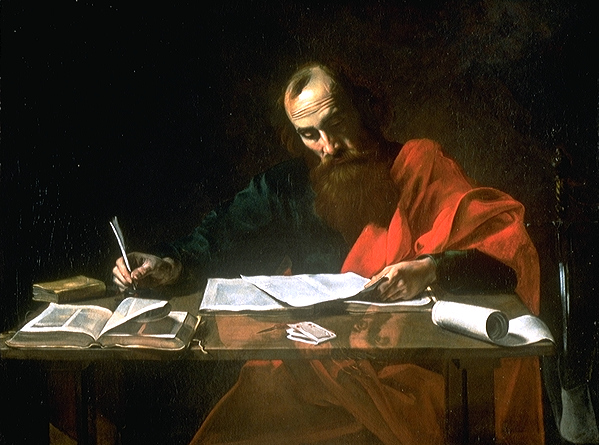
Paul the Apostle is often cited by those who believe that Israelite religious law is no longer needed in observance.

Supersessionism, also called fulfillment theology by its proponents and replacement theology by its detractors, is the Christian doctrine that the Christian Church has superseded the Jewish people, assuming their role as God's covenanted people, thus asserting that the New Covenant through Jesus has superseded or replaced the Mosaic covenant. Supersessionists hold that the universal Church has become God's "New Israel" and thus Christians are the people of God, not Jews.

Often claimed by later Christians to have originated with Paul the Apostle in the New Testament, supersessionism has been a core tenet of many Eastern Orthodox, Roman Catholic, and Lutheran churches for most of their history. Many early Church Fathers, including Justin Martyr and Augustine of Hippo, were supersessionists.

Most historic Christian churches, including the Roman Catholic Church, Lutheran churches, and historic Reformed churches and Methodist churches, hold that the Old Covenant has three components: ceremonial, moral, and civil (cf. covenant theology). They teach that while the ceremonial and civil (judicial) laws have been fulfilled, the moral law of the Ten Commandments continues to bind Christians. Since the 19th century, certain Christian communities, such as the Plymouth Brethren, have espoused dispensationalist theology as opposed to supersessionism and covenant theology. Additionally, as part of Christian–Jewish reconciliation, the Roman Catholic Church has placed increased emphasis on the shared history of the Christian and modern Jewish religions.

Rabbinic Judaism rejects supersessionism as offensive to Jewish history. Islam teaches that it is the final and most authentic expression of Abrahamic monotheism, superseding both Judaism and Christianity.

== Etymology ==
The word supersessionism comes from the English verb to supersede, from the Latin verb sedeo, sedere, sedi, sessum, "to sit", plus super, "upon". It thus signifies one thing being replaced or supplanted by another.

Many Christian theologians have seen the New Covenant in Christ as a replacement for the Mosaic Covenant and the Church as the new people of God. Sydney Thelwall used the word supersession in the title of chapter three of his 1870 translation of Tertullian's An Answer to the Jews.

== Early Church ==
=== New Testament ===
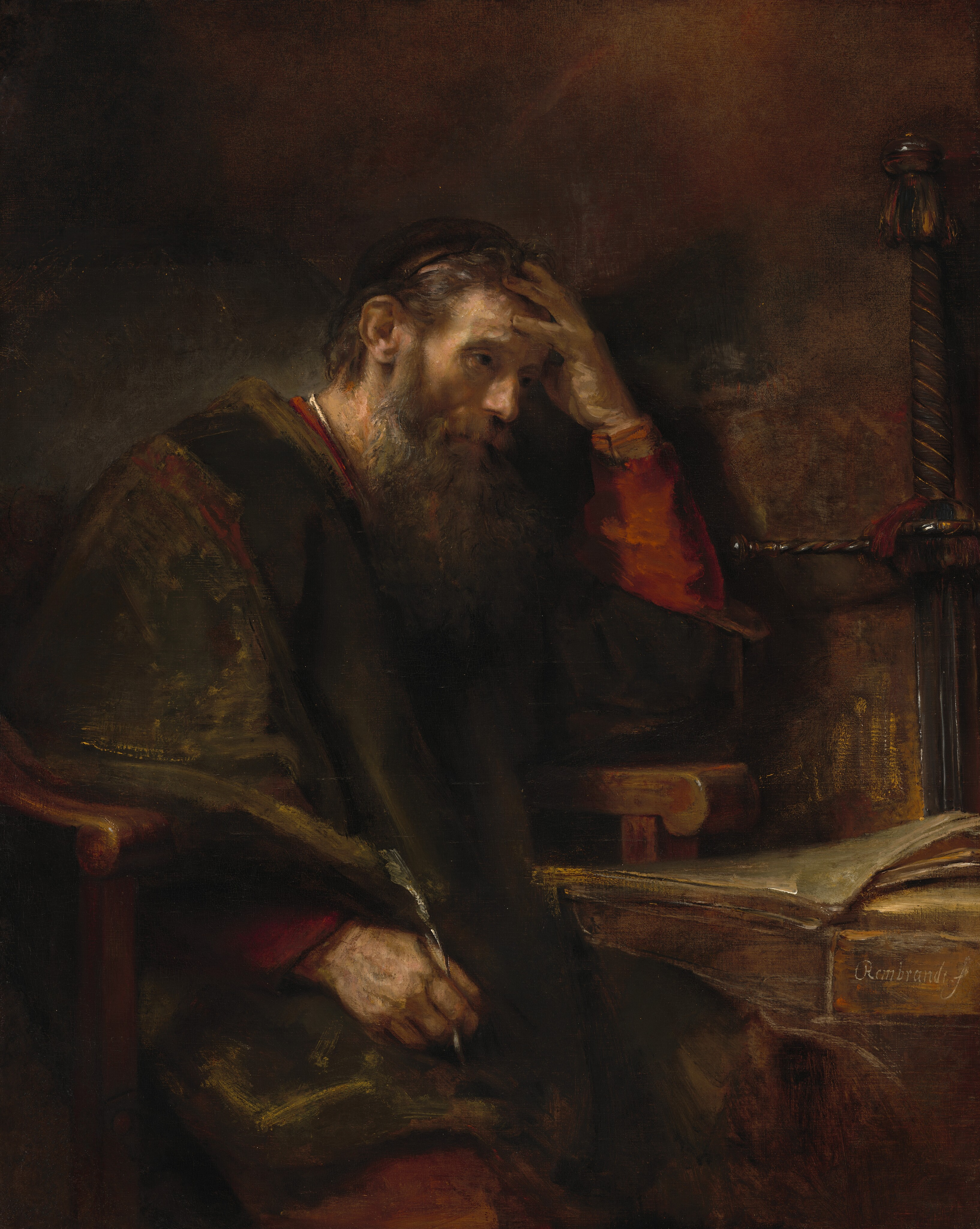
Paul the Apostle, by Rembrandt Harmensz van Rijn c. 1657

In the New Testament, Jesus and others repeatedly give Jews priority in their mission, as in Jesus's expression of him coming to the Jews rather than to gentiles and in Paul the Apostle's formula "to the Jew first and also to the Greek". Yet after Jesus's death, the inclusion of the gentiles as equals in this burgeoning sect of Judaism caused problems, particularly when it came to gentiles keeping the Mosaic law, which was both a major issue at the Council of Jerusalem and a theme of Paul's Epistle to the Galatians, though the relationship of Paul and Judaism is still disputed.

Paul's views on the Jews are complex, but he is generally regarded as the first person to make the claim that by not accepting claims of Jesus's divinity, non-believing Jews disqualified themselves from salvation. Paul himself was a Jew. After a conversion experience, he came to accept Jesus's claim to be the Messiah. According to Roman Catholic ex-priest James Carroll, accepting Jesus's divinity was, for Paul, dichotomous with being a Jew. His personal conversion and his understanding of the dichotomy between being Jewish and accepting Jesus's divinity were the religious philosophies he wanted to see Jews of his time adopt. But New Testament scholar N. T. Wright argues that Paul saw his faith in Jesus as precisely the fulfillment of his Judaism and saw no tension between being Jewish and Christian. Christians quickly adopted Paul's views.

For most of Christian history, supersessionism has been the mainstream interpretation of the New Testament of all three major historical traditions within Christianity—Orthodox, Roman Catholic, and Protestant. The text most often adduced in favor of supersessionism is Hebrews 8:13: "In speaking of 'a new covenant' Jeremiah 31:31–32 he has made the first one obsolete." Other statements by Jesus have also been used, including Matthew 21:43, "Therefore I tell you, the kingdom of God will be taken away from you and given to a people producing its fruits."

=== Church Fathers ===
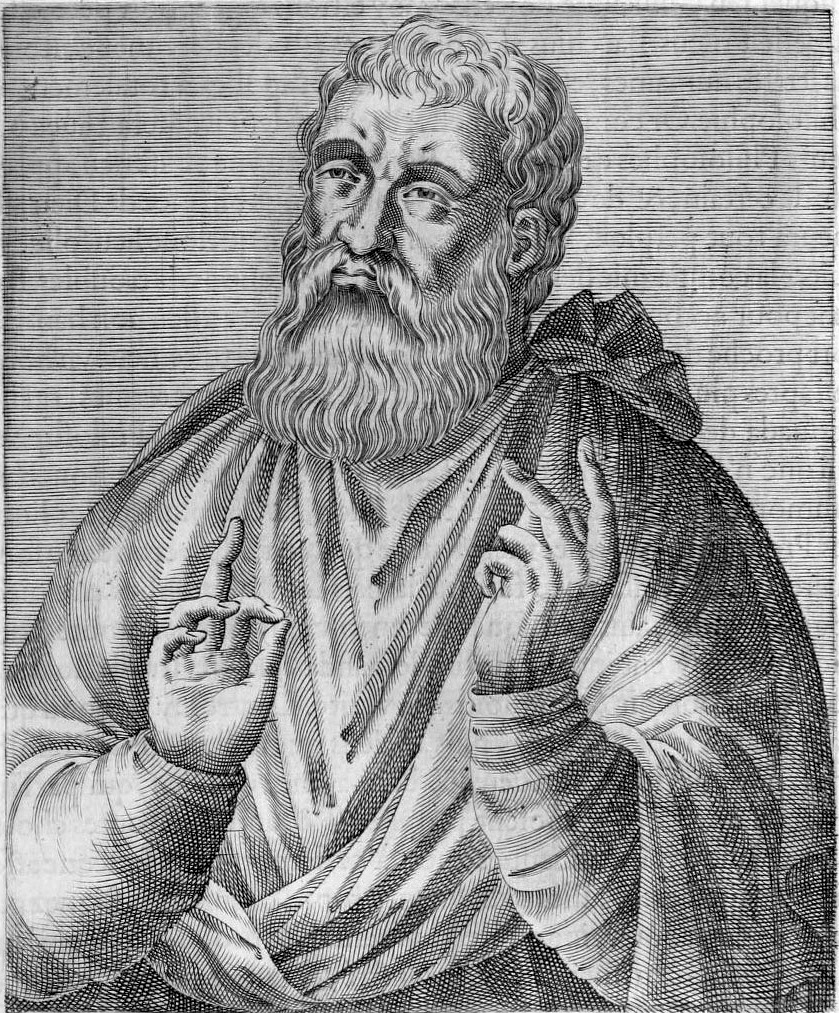
Justin Martyr considered Christians the true spiritual Israel.

Many early Christian commentators taught that the Old Covenant was fulfilled and superseded by the New Covenant in Jesus. Justin Martyr wrote that the "true spiritual Israel" referred to those who had "been led to God through this crucified Christ". Irenaeus taught that, while the New Covenant had superseded the old, the moral law underlying the Law of Moses continued to stand in the New Covenant. Tertullian believed that the New Covenant brought with it a new law, writing:

Who else, therefore, are understood but we, who, fully taught by the new law, observe these practices, the old law being obliterated, the coming of whose abolition the action itself demonstrates. ...Therefore, as we have shown above that the coming cessation of the old law and of the carnal circumcision was declared, so, too, the observance of the new law and the spiritual circumcision has shone out into the voluntary observances of peace.

Augustine of Hippo followed the views of the earlier Church Fathers but emphasized the importance to Christianity of the continued existence of the separate Rabbinic Jewish faith: "The Jews ... are thus by their own Scriptures a testimony to us that we have not forged the prophecies about Christ." The Catholic Church built its system of eschatology on his theology, where Jesus rules the earth spiritually through his triumphant church. Yet Augustine also said to "love" the Jews as a means to convert them to Christianity. Jeremy Cohen, followed by John Y. B. Hood and James Carroll, sees this as having had decisive social consequences. Carroll writes, "It is not too much to say that, at this juncture, Christianity 'permitted' Judaism to endure because of Augustine."

== Contemporary views ==
=== Eastern Orthodox ===
In the early days, views of supersessionism varied within the Orthodox Church, though it did not use that term. More recently, supersessionism has been reconsidered, and some churches have explicitly rejected it.

=== Roman Catholic ===
Supersessionism is not the name of any official Roman Catholic teaching, and the word does not appear in any Church documents. Yet, official Catholic teaching has reflected varying levels of supersessionist thought throughout its history, especially before the mid-20th century. The theology that religious Jews dissent by continuing to exist outside the Church is extensive in Catholic liturgy and literature. The Second Vatican Council (Vatican II) marked a shift in emphasis of official Catholic teaching about Judaism, a shift that may be described as a move from "hard" to "soft" supersessionism, in David Novak's terminology.

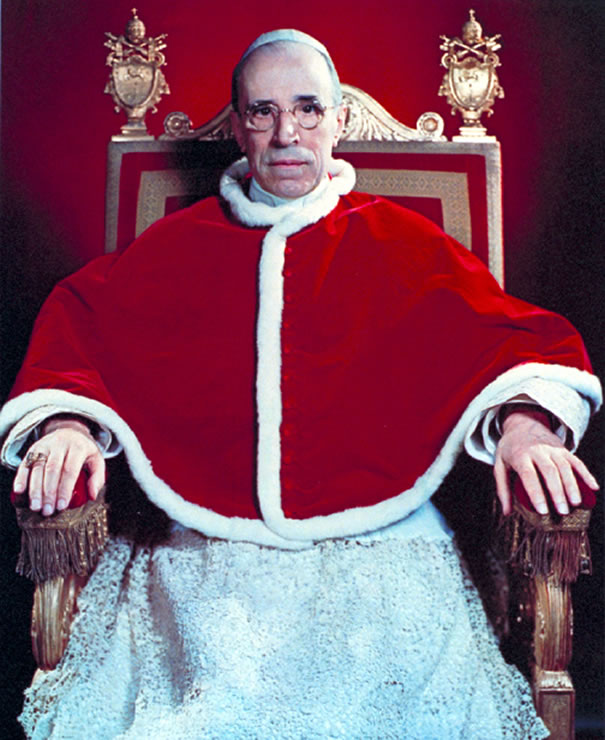
Pope Pius XII held supersessionist views.

Until Vatican II, Catholic teaching on the matter was characterized by "displacement" or "substitution" theologies, according to which the Church and its New Covenant took the place of Judaism and its "Old Covenant", the latter being rendered void by the coming of Jesus. The nullification of the Old Covenant was often explained in terms of the "deicide charge": that Jews forfeited their covenantal relationship with God by executing the divine Jesus. In 1943, Pope Pius XII wrote in his encyclical Mystici corporis Christi:

By the death of our Redeemer, the New Testament took the place of the Old Law which had been abolished; then the Law of Christ together with its mysteries, enactments, institutions, and sacred rites was ratified for the whole world in the blood of Jesus Christ. [...] [O]n the gibbet of His death Jesus made void the Law with its decrees and fastened the handwriting of the Old Testament to the Cross, establishing the New Testament in His blood shed for the whole human race.

At the Second Vatican Council, which convened two decades after the Holocaust, a different framework emerged for how Catholics should think about the Jewish covenant. The declaration Nostra aetate, promulgated in 1965, made several statements signaling a development away from "hard supersessionist" replacement thinking, according to which God no longer acknowledged the Jews' covenant. Retrieving Paul's language in chapter 11 of his Epistle to the Romans, the declaration states, "God holds the Jews most dear for the sake of their Fathers; He does not repent of the gifts He makes or of the calls He issues. [...] Although the Church is the new people of God, the Jews should not be presented as rejected or accursed by God, as if this followed from the Holy Scriptures." A draft of the declaration contained a passage that called for "the entry of that [Jewish] people into the fullness of the people of God established by Christ", but at the suggestion of Catholic priest (and convert from Judaism) John M. Oesterreicher, it was replaced in the final version by the following language: "the Church awaits that day, known to God alone, on which all peoples will address the Lord in a single voice and 'serve him shoulder to shoulder' (Zeph 3:9)."

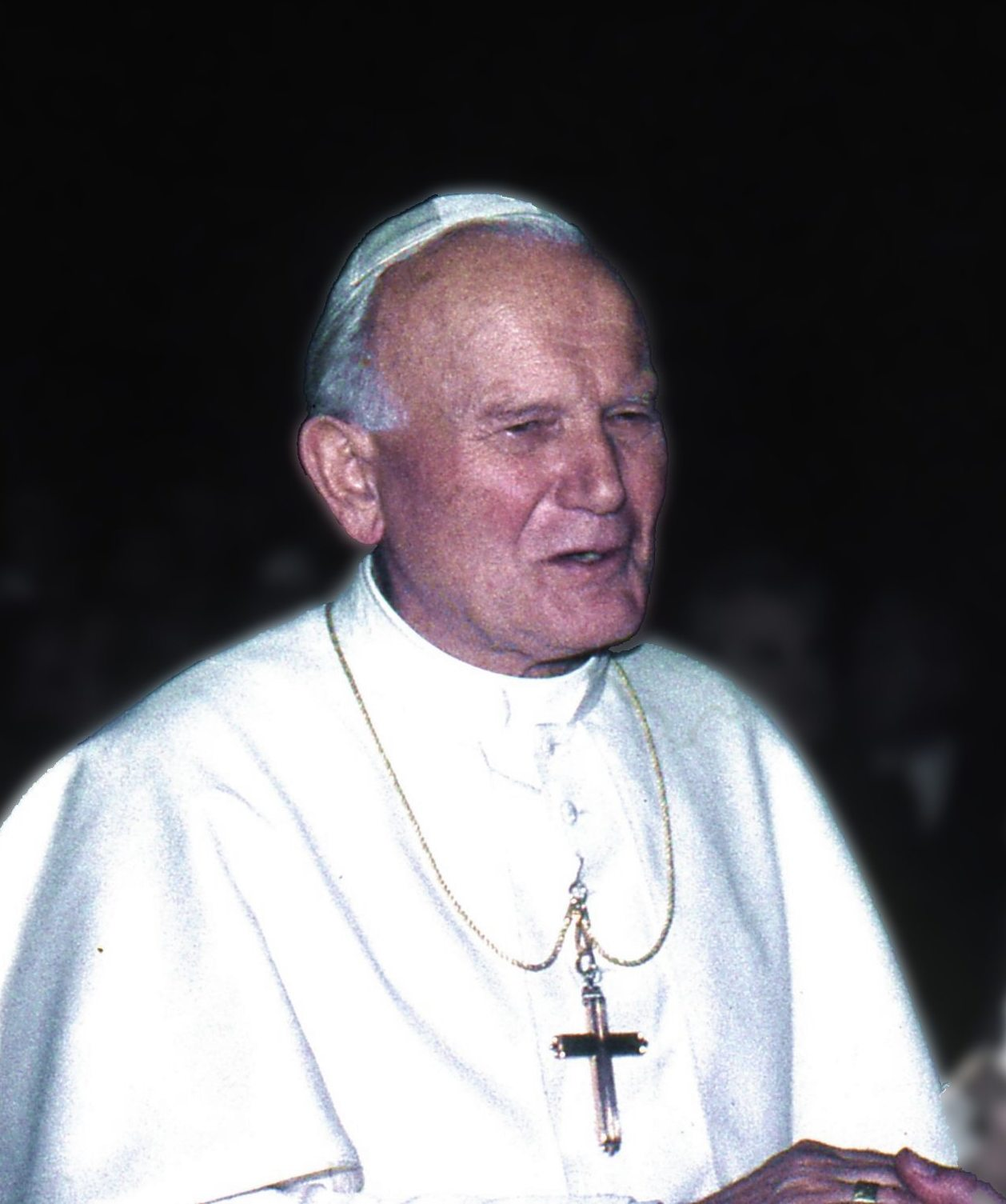
Pope John Paul II affirmed the "soft" supersessionism of the Second Vatican Council.

Pope John Paul II led further developments in Catholic thinking on the covenantal status of ethnic Jews. One of his most notable statements on the matter occurred during his 1980 visit to the synagogue in Mainz, when he called Jews the "people of God of the Old Covenant, which has never been abrogated by God" (Romans 11:29: "for the gifts and the calling of God are irrevocable"). In 1997, John Paul II again affirmed the Jews' covenantal status: "This people continues in spite of everything to be the people of the covenant and, despite human infidelity, the Lord is faithful to his covenant."

Cardinal Joseph Ratzinger, who later became Pope Benedict XVI, wrote in his 1999 work Many Religions – One Covenant, "the Sinai [Mosaic] Covenant is indeed superseded."

The post-Vatican II shift toward acknowledging ethnic Jews as a covenanted people led to heated discussion in the Church over missionary activity directed toward Jews. Cardinal Avery Dulles wrote, "if Christ is the redeemer of the world, every tongue should confess him", while others vehemently oppose "targeting Jews for conversion". Cardinal Walter Kasper, then president of the Pontifical Commission for Religious Relations with the Jews, reaffirmed the validity of the Jews' covenant, writing:

[B]ecause as Christians we know that God's covenant with Israel by God's faithfulness is not broken (Rom 11:29; cf. 3:4), mission understood as call to conversion from idolatry to the living and true God (Thes 1:9) does not apply and cannot be applied to Jews. [...] This is not a merely abstract theological affirmation, but an affirmation that has concrete and tangible consequences; namely, that there is no organised Catholic missionary activity towards Jews as there is for all other non-Christian religions.

— Walter Kasper, "The Commission for Religious Relations with the Jews: A Crucial Endeavour of the Catholic Church" (2002)

In his apostolic exhortation Evangelii gaudium (2013), Pope Francis emphasized communal heritage and mutual respect for each other, writing:

We hold the Jewish people in special regard because their covenant with God has never been revoked, for "the gifts and the call of God are irrevocable" (Rom 11:29). The Church, which shares with Jews an important part of the sacred Scriptures, looks upon the people of the covenant and their faith as one of the sacred roots of her own Christian identity (cf. Rom 11:16–18). As Christians, we cannot consider Judaism as a foreign religion; nor do we include the Jews among those called to turn from idols and to serve the true God (Thes 1:9). With them, we believe in the one God who acts in history, and with them we accept his revealed word.

— Pope Francis, Evangelii Gaudium (2013)

Similarly, Kasper highlights God's relationship with the Jewish people, but differs from Francis in calling Judaism salvific: "God's grace, which is the grace of Jesus Christ according to our faith, is available to all. Therefore, the Church believes that Judaism, [as] the faithful response of the Jewish people to God's irrevocable covenant, is salvific for them, because God is faithful to his promises." In 2011, Kasper specifically repudiated the notion of "displacement" theology, clarifying that the "New Covenant for Christians is not the replacement (substitution), but the fulfillment of the Old Covenant".

These statements signal a remaining point of debate, where some adhere to a movement away from supersessionism, and others retain what can be called a "soft" supersessionism. Traditionalist Catholic groups, such as the schismatic Society of St. Pius X, strongly oppose Vatican II's theological developments concerning Judaism and maintain "hard" supersessionist views. Even among mainstream Catholic groups and official Catholic teaching, elements of soft supersessionism remain. The Catechism of the Catholic Church refers to a future corporate repentance on the part of Jews:

The glorious Messiah's coming is suspended at every moment of history until his recognition by 'all Israel,' for 'a hardening has come upon part of Israel' in their 'unbelief' toward Jesus [Rom 11:20-26; cf. Mt 23:39]. [...] The 'full inclusion' of the Jews in the Messiah's salvation, in the wake of 'the full number of the Gentiles' [Rom 11:12, 25; cf. Lk 21:24], will enable the People of God to achieve 'the measure of the stature of the fullness of Christ,' in which 'God may be all in all.'

In the Second Vatican Council's Lumen gentium (1964), the Church wrote that God "chose the race of Israel as a people" and "set up a covenant" with them, instructing them and making them holy. But "all these things [...] were done by way of preparation and as a figure of that new and perfect covenant" instituted by and ratified in Christ (No. 9). Vatican II also affirmed that "the Church is the new people of God" without being "Israel according to the flesh", the Jewish people.

In Notes on the Correct Way to Present the Jews and Judaism (1985), the Church's Commission for Religious Relations with the Jews wrote that the "Church and Judaism cannot then be seen as two parallel ways of salvation and the Church must witness to Christ as the Redeemer of all."

=== Protestant ===
Modern Protestants hold a range of positions on supersessionism and the relationship between the Church and the Jewish people. These differences arise from dissimilar literal versus figurative approaches to understanding the relationships between the covenants of the Bible, particularly the relationship between the covenants of the Old Testament and the New Covenant.

After the establishment of the political state of Israel in the wake of the Holocaust, mainstream Christian theologians and denominations began to re-examine supersessionism, and some communities came to reject the teaching outright. Protestant hermeneutical frameworks tend to guide views on the subject, with covenant theology generally associated with supersessionism and dispensationalism generally opposed to supersessionism. Christian Zionism is also associated with a rejection of supersessionism; dual-covenant theology contrasts with supersessionism by holding that the Mosaic covenant remains valid for rabbinical Jews.

Differing approaches influence how the land promise in Genesis 12, 15 and 17 is understood, whether it is interpreted literally or figuratively, both with regard to the land and the identity of people who inherit it.

Adherents to these various views are not restricted to a single denomination, though some traditions teach a certain view. Classical covenant theology is taught within the Presbyterian and Continental Reformed traditions. Methodist hermeneutics traditionally use a variation of this, known as Wesleyan covenant theology, which is consistent with Arminian soteriology. Certain mainline American denominations (e.g. TEC, ELCA, UMC) have released non-supersessionist statements. Liberal Protestant opponents to supersessionism associate the doctrine with racist motivations.

Paul van Buren developed a thoroughly nonsupersessionist position, in contrast to Karl Barth, his mentor. He wrote, "The reality of the Jewish people, fixed in history by the reality of their election, in their faithfulness in spite of their unfaithfulness, is as solid and sure as that of the gentile church."

==== Lutheranism ====
The Lutheran Churches have historically taught the doctrine of supersessionism. This continues to be taught in Confessional Lutheran denominations, such as the Lutheran Church – Missouri Synod, which have rejected a Christian theological basis for Zionism.

==== Reformed ====
The Reformed (Continental Reformed, Presbyterian, Congregationalist and Reformed Anglican) tradition adheres to covenant theology and historically has taught that "Christ fulfills the expectations of Jewish covenant life and renews the people of God rooted in the Old Testament and Judaism" and that "Jesus is the new temple, the new Israel."

=== Latter-day Saints ===
Mormonism professes to be the restoration of the original Christian faith and that the ancient Hebrew religion was a form of proto-Christianity. Nevertheless, Latter-day Saints believe that the modern-day descendants of Israel are still God's covenant people, but they have nonetheless apostatized from the proto-Christian faith that God anciently revealed through the ancient patriarchs and Israel's prophets. For example, the Book of Moses narrates that the biblical patriarch Enoch was shown a vision of Jesus as the Messiah who should be crucified and resurrected. The Book of Abraham narrates that God revealed to the titular biblical patriarch a vision of the Son of Man (a common title for Jesus Christ) being chosen in a premortal council to serve as the Redeemer of humankind.

Historically, Latter-day Saint leaders and church instructional materials have promoted the idea that those who accept baptism into the church are literal descendants of the scattered Israelites, primarily the tribe of Ephraim. However, those teachings have been de-emphasized since the latter 20th century in favor of a competing narrative regarding members being adopted or "grafted" into the House of Israel.

The title page of the Book of Mormon—which adherents believe is among the content translated by Joseph Smith from the gold plates—states that one of its primary purposes is "to the convincing of the Jew and Gentile that Jesus is the Christ, the Eternal God." The Nephites—whom the Book of Mormon presents as ancient Israelites who escaped Jerusalem just before the Babylonian captivity—are said to have kept the Law of Moses with an understanding that it presaged Christ's messianic mission. The Book of Mormon further teaches that because the Jews rejected and crucified Christ, they will be scattered among the nations of the earth and scourged across generations until they accept Christ as the true Messiah. According to the Doctrine and Covenants, after Jesus reveals himself to the Jews, they will weep because of their iniquities.

In 1982, Elder Bruce R. McConkie, a member of the Quorum of the Twelve Apostles in the Church of Jesus Christ of Latter-day Saints, published a book titled The Millennial Messiah, which devotes an entire chapter to "The Jews and the Second Coming". It states:

Let this fact be engraved in the eternal records with a pen of steel: the Jews were cursed, and smitten, and cursed anew, because they rejected the gospel, cast out their Messiah, and crucified their King. [...] Let the spiritually illiterate suppose what they may, it was the Jewish denial and rejection of the Holy One of Israel, whom their fathers worshiped in the beauty and holiness, that has made them a hiss and byword in all nations and that has taken millions of their fair sons and daughters to untimely graves. [...] What sayeth the holy word? "They shall be scourged by all people, because they crucify the God of Israel, and turn the hearts aside, rejecting signs and wonders, and the power and glory of the God of Israel. And because they turn their hearts aside, [...] and have despised the Holy One of Israel, they shall wander in the flesh, and perish, and become a hiss and by-word and be hated among all nations.: (1 Ne. 19:13-14; 2 Ne. 6:9-11.) Such is the prophetic word of Nephi."

Some Jews consider the Latter-day Saint practice of posthumous baptism a particularly disrespectful enactment of supersessionist beliefs, and although the Church implemented guidelines restricting proxy baptism of Jewish Holocaust victims, the practice of baptizing deceased Jews has continued.

=== Jewish ===
Rabbinic Judaism rejects supersessionism, discussing it only as an idea upheld by Christian and Muslim theologians. Some Jews have considered it antisemitic.

=== Muslim ===
Islamic teaching on tahrif holds that earlier monotheistic scriptures or their earlier interpretations have been corrupted by later interpretations, while the Quran presents a pure and unaltered version of their divine message.

In its canonical form, the Islamic idea of tahrif holds that Jewish and Christian scriptures, or their interpretations, have been corrupted, thereby obscuring the divine message they originally contained. According to this teaching, the Quran both points out and corrects the supposed errors introduced by previous corruption of monotheistic scriptures, making it the final and most pure divine revelation.

Sandra Toenis Keiting argues that Islam was supersessionist from its inception, advocating the view that the Quranic revelations would "replace the corrupted scriptures possessed by other communities", and that early Islamic scriptures display a "clear theology of revelation that is concerned with establishing the credibility of the nascent community" vis-à-vis other religions. In contrast, Abdulaziz Sachedina has argued that Islamic supersessionism stems not from the Quran or hadith, but rather from the work of Muslim jurists who reinterpreted the Quranic message about islam (in its literal meaning of 'submission') being "the only true religion with God [...] in the context of the political and social position of the community", thereby providing theoretical justification for Muslim political dominance and a wider interpretation of the notion of jihad, leading Muslim jurists to claim that Islam is superior to other religions.

In Islamic legal exegesis (tafsir), abrogation (naskh) is the theory developed to resolve contradictory Quranic revelation by amending the earlier revelation. Only Quran 2:106 uses a form of the word naskh (specifically nanskh meaning 'we abrogate'). Q2:106 indicates two varieties of abrogation: "supersession" – the "suspension" and replacement of the old verse without its elimination – or "suppression" – the nullification of the old verse from the written Quran (mus'haf).

== Types ==
Both Christian and Jewish theologians have identified different types of supersessionism in the Christian reading of the Bible.

R. Kendall Soulen notes three categories of supersessionism identified by Christian theologians: punitive, economic, and structural:

- Punitive supersessionism is represented by such Christian thinkers as Hippolytus of Rome, Origen, and Martin Luther. It is the view that Jews who reject Jesus as the Jewish Messiah are consequently condemned by God, forfeiting the promises otherwise due to them under the covenants.
- Economic supersessionism is used in the technical theological sense of function (see economic Trinity). It is the view that the practical purpose of the nation of Israel in God's plan is replaced by the role of the Church. It is represented by writers such as Justin Martyr, Augustine, and Barth.
- Structural supersessionism is Soulen's term for the de facto marginalization of the Old Testament as normative for Christian thought. In his words, "Structural supersessionism refers to the narrative logic of the standard model whereby it renders the Hebrew Scriptures largely indecisive for shaping Christian convictions about how God's works as Consummator and Redeemer engage humankind in universal and enduring ways." Soulen's terminology is used by Craig A. Blaising, in "The Future of Israel as a Theological Question".

These three views are neither mutually exclusive, nor logically dependent, and it is possible to hold all of them or any one with or without the others. The work of Matthew Tapie attempts a further clarification of the language of supersessionism in modern theology that Peter Ochs has called "the clearest teaching on supersessionism in modern scholarship." Tapie argued that Soulen's view of economic supersessionism shares important similarities with those of Jules Isaac's thought (the French-Jewish historian well known for his identification of "the teaching of contempt" in the Christian tradition) and can ultimately be traced to the medieval concept of the "cessation of the law" – the idea that Jewish observance of the ceremonial law (Sabbath, circumcision, and dietary laws) ceases to have a positive significance for Jews after the passion of Christ. According to Soulen, Christians today often repudiate supersessionism but they do not always carefully examine just what that is supposed to mean. Soulen thinks Tapie's work is a remedy to this situation.

== See also ==
- Abrogation of Old Covenant laws
- Anti-Judaism
- Antinomianism
- Antisemitism in Christianity
- Antisemitism in Islam
- Christian anti-Judaism
- Christianity and Judaism
- Christian–Jewish reconciliation
- Christian observances of Jewish holidays
- Christian views on the Old Covenant
- Christian Zionism
- Circumcision controversy in early Christianity
- Conversion of the Jews (future event)
- Criticism of Judaism
- Judaizers
- New Covenant theology
- Philosemitism
- Religious antisemitism
- Sabbatarianism
