= Zechariah 13 =

Bible chapter

- ← chapter 12 chapter 14 →
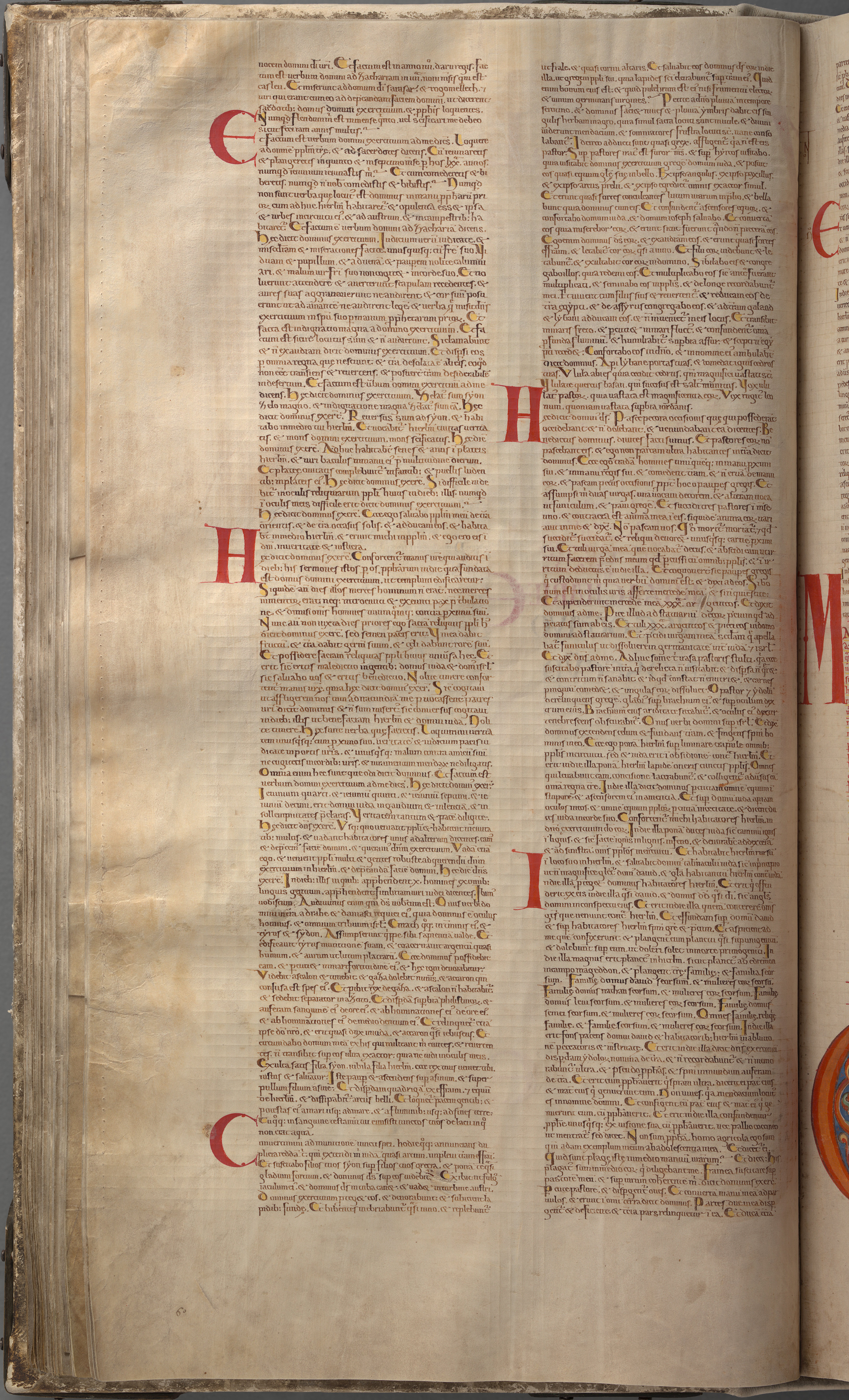
- Book of Zechariah (6:15-13:9) in Latin in Codex Gigas, made around 13th century.
- Book: Book of Zechariah
- Category: Nevi'im
- Christian Bible part: Old Testament
- Order in the Christian part: 38

Zechariah 13 is the thirteenth of the 14 chapters in the Book of Zechariah in the Hebrew Bible or the Old Testament of the Christian Bible. This book contains the prophecies attributed to the prophet Zechariah. In the Hebrew Bible it is part of the Book of the Twelve Minor Prophets. This chapter is a part of a section (so-called "Second Zechariah") consisting of Zechariah 9–14. Verses 1–6 may be seen as continuous with chapter 12, whereas verses 7–9 form a separate "invocation", forming a three-section "entity" with 14:1-21.

== Text ==
The original text was written in the Hebrew language. This chapter is divided into 9 verses.

=== Textual witnesses ===
Some early manuscripts containing the text of this chapter in Hebrew are of the Masoretic Text, which includes the Codex Cairensis (from year 895), the Petersburg Codex of the Prophets (916), Aleppo Codex (930), and Codex Leningradensis (1008).

There is also a translation into Koine Greek known as the Septuagint, made in the last few centuries BC. Extant ancient manuscripts of the Septuagint version include Codex Vaticanus (B; $\mathfrak{G}$^{B}; 4th century), Codex Sinaiticus (S; BHK: $\mathfrak{G}$^{S}; 4th century), Codex Alexandrinus (A; $\mathfrak{G}$^{A}; 5th century) and Codex Marchalianus (Q; $\mathfrak{G}$^{Q}; 6th century).

== Idolatry cut off (verses 1–6) ==
Three proclamations concerning "when that day comes" follow on from six similar proclamations in chapter 12. The phrase "that day" has a range of biblical uses; biblical writer Katrina Larkin suggests that in Zechariah its meaning is eschatological. These verses mark the end of "true prophecy", meaning that any further prophecy would be "false prophecy": Larkin comments that the bracketing together of "the prophets" and "the unclean spirit" in verse 2 is "remarkable". This section clearly alludes to Amos 7:14 concerning the denial of being a prophet by profession (as opposed to by divine call); it may also allude to Deuteronomy 18:20–21 and Jeremiah 23:30–40 about the issue of "distinguishing between true and false prophecy".

== The smitten shepherd (verses 7–9) ==
This section follows the previous one to emphasize that as 'the prophets will be unnecessary, the shepherds will also be unnecessary in the eschatological future, because God himself will take drastic action to restore his people. A connection to Zechariah 11:17 has been suggested due to the common theme of "sword" as well as allusions to Ezekiel 5:1–4 (verse 8) and Hosea 2:23 (verse 9d) are deemed plausible.

=== Verse 7 ===
Awake, O sword, against my shepherd,

and against the man that is my fellow,

saith the Lord of hosts:

smite the shepherd,

and the sheep shall be scattered:

and I will turn mine hand upon the little ones.

The medieval French rabbi Rashi interprets "shepherd" as "the one whom [God] appointed over the flock of [His] exile". The Christian gospels pick up this verse, stating that Jesus referred to it in anticipating that his disciples would be scattered following his arrest.

== See also ==
- David
- Jerusalem
- Related Bible parts: Ezekiel 5, Hosea 2, Matthew 26, Mark 14

== Sources ==
- Boda, Mark J. (2016). Harrison, R. K.; Hubbard, Jr, Robert L. (eds.). The Book of Zechariah. New International Commentary on the Old Testament. Wm. B. Eerdmans Publishing. ISBN 978-0802823755.
- Collins, John J. (2014). Introduction to the Hebrew Scriptures. Fortress Press. ISBN 9781451469233.
- Coogan, Michael David (2007). Coogan, Michael David; Brettler, Marc Zvi; Newsom, Carol Ann; Perkins, Pheme (eds.). The New Oxford Annotated Bible with the Apocryphal/Deuterocanonical Books: New Revised Standard Version, Issue 48 (Augmented 3rd ed.). Oxford University Press. ISBN 9780195288810.
- Floyd, Michael H. (2000). Minor Prophets, Part 2. Forms of the Old Testament Literature. Vol. 22. Wm. B. Eerdmans Publishing. ISBN 978-0802844521.
- Hayes, Christine (2015). Introduction to the Bible. Yale University Press. ISBN 978-0300188271.
- Larkin, Katrina J. A. (2007). "37. Zechariah". In Barton, John; Muddiman, John (eds.). The Oxford Bible Commentary (first (paperback) ed.). Oxford University Press. pp. 610–615. ISBN 978-0199277186.
- Mason, Rex (1993). "Zechariah, The Book of.". In Metzger, Bruce M; Coogan, Michael D (eds.). The Oxford Companion to the Bible. Oxford University Press. ISBN 978-0195046458.
- Rogerson, John W. (2003). "Zechariah". In Dunn, James D. G.; Rogerson, John William (eds.). Eerdmans Commentary on the Bible (illustrated ed.). Wm. B. Eerdmans Publishing. pp. 721–729. ISBN 978-0802837110.
- Würthwein, Ernst (1995). The Text of the Old Testament. Translated by Rhodes, Erroll F. Grand Rapids, MI: Wm. B. Eerdmans. ISBN 0-8028-0788-7.
