= Zechariah 10 =

Bible chapter

- ← chapter 9 chapter 11 →
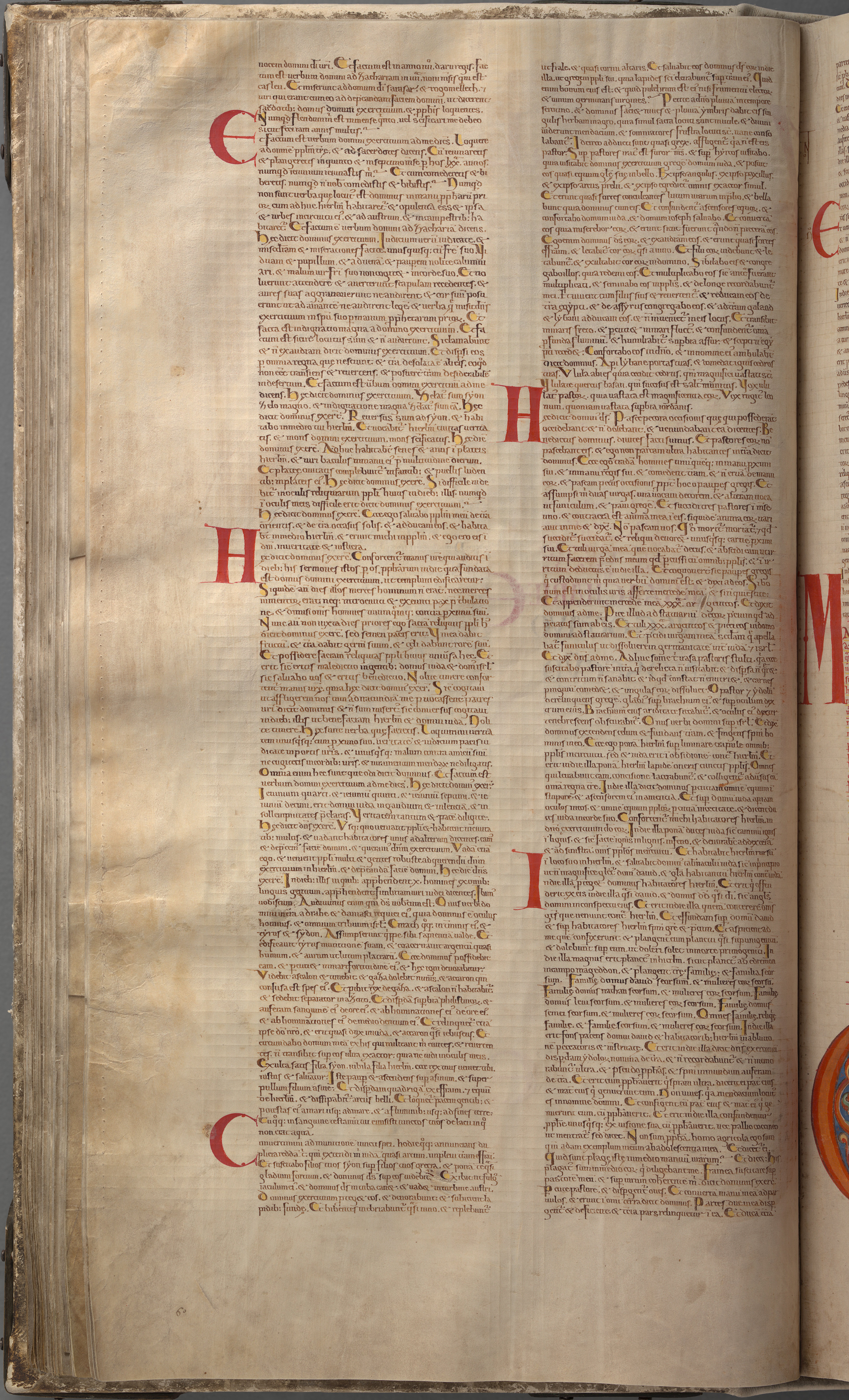
- Book of Zechariah (6:15-13:9) in Latin in Codex Gigas, made around 13th century.
- Book: Book of Zechariah
- Category: Nevi'im
- Christian Bible part: Old Testament
- Order in the Christian part: 38

Zechariah 10 is the tenth of the 14 chapters in the Book of Zechariah in the Hebrew Bible or the Old Testament of the Christian Bible. This book contains the prophecies attributed to the prophet Zechariah. In the Hebrew Bible it is part of the Book of the Twelve Minor Prophets. This chapter is a part of a section consisting of Zechariah 9–14, attributed to the so-called "Second Zechariah", an anonymous successor to the Zechariah of chapters 1-8.

== Text ==
The original text was written in the Hebrew language. This chapter is divided into 12 verses.

=== Textual witnesses ===
Some early manuscripts containing the text of this chapter in Hebrew are of the Masoretic Text, which includes the Codex Cairensis (from year 895), the Petersburg Codex of the Prophets (916), Aleppo Codex (930), and Codex Leningradensis (1008). Fragments containing parts of this chapter were found among the Dead Sea Scrolls, that is, 4Q82 (4QXII^{g}; 50–25 BCE) with extant verses 11–12.

There is also a translation into Koine Greek known as the Septuagint, made in the last few centuries BCE. Extant ancient manuscripts of the Septuagint version include Codex Vaticanus (B; $\mathfrak{G}$^{B}; 4th century), Codex Sinaiticus (S; BHK: $\mathfrak{G}$^{S}; 4th century), Codex Alexandrinus (A; $\mathfrak{G}$^{A}; 5th century) and Codex Marchalianus (Q; $\mathfrak{G}$^{Q}; 6th century).

== Prophetic warning against superstition (10:1–2) ==
This section contains an oracle urging the people to turn to God alone and regrets the lack of proper leadership or shepherding. The polemic against the 'bad shepherds' here continues a tradition found in Jeremiah 23 and Ezekiel 34.

=== Verse 1 ===
Ask ye of the Lord rain in the time of the latter rain; so the Lord shall make bright clouds, and give them showers of rain, to every one grass in the field.

"The latter rain" refers to the period of heavy rainfall in the spring of the year (around March or April) in Palestine. Eschatologically the "latter rain" points to "the end times" when God will pour out blessings (cf. Hosea 6:3; Joel 2:21-25). The wording "bright clouds" in the King James Version is rendered as "storm clouds" in other translations.

=== Verse 2 ===
For the idols have spoken vanity,

and the diviners have seen a lie,

and have told false dreams;

they comfort in vain:

therefore they went their way as a flock, they were troubled,

because there was no shepherd.

- " Idols": "teraphim"; sculptures or images of human form and sometimes of life size (Genesis 31:19; 1 Samuel 19:13), in ancient times worshiped to grant temporal blessings or to provide oracles (Judges 17:5; Judges 18:5, 24; Ezekiel 21:21). The book of Hosea mentions "teraphim" with "ephod," as forbidden means of enquiry in the future ("without an ephod and without teraphim" Hosea 3:4) and the book of Judges connects them with the mingled worship of Micah (Judges 17:5; Judges 18:14, Judges 18:17–18, Judges 18:20).
- "Have seen a lie": that is "being given up to judicial blindness", because these 'diviners' didn't care for the truth (2 Thessalonians 2:10) as the Targum calls "the diviners prophesy falsehood."
- "Have told false dreams": Vulgate, somniatores locuti sunt frustra; Greek Septuagint: τὰ ἐνύπνια ψευδῆ ἐλάλουν, "spoke false dreams" (cf. Job 21:34).
- "Comfort in vain": literally, "give vapor for comfort" (cf. Job 13:4; 16:2; 21:34).
- "There was no shepherd": that is "no king to guard and lead them", so the people fell under the power of foreign rulers, who oppressed them (Ezekiel 34:5; Nehemiah 5:15).

== Yahweh's holy war and the return from exile (10:3–12) ==
Yahweh will punish the bad shepherds (leaders) and will produce a leadership ("the cornerstone, the tent peg and the battle bow" in verse 4) from the "house of Judah", so with YHWH's power alone the people are gathered from their places of exile similar to the Exodus (verse 11).

== See also ==
- Assyria
- Egypt
- Gilead
- Lebanon
- Jerusalem
- Teraphim
- Related Bible parts: Psalm 118, Ezekiel 36, Ezekiel 37

== Sources ==
- Boda, Mark J. (2016). Harrison, R. K.; Hubbard, Jr, Robert L. (eds.). The Book of Zechariah. New International Commentary on the Old Testament. Wm. B. Eerdmans Publishing. ISBN 978-0802823755.
- Collins, John J. (2014). Introduction to the Hebrew Scriptures. Fortress Press. ISBN 9781451469233.
- Coogan, Michael David (2007). Coogan, Michael David; Brettler, Marc Zvi; Newsom, Carol Ann; Perkins, Pheme (eds.). The New Oxford Annotated Bible with the Apocryphal/Deuterocanonical Books: New Revised Standard Version, Issue 48 (Augmented 3rd ed.). Oxford University Press. ISBN 9780195288810.
- Fitzmyer, Joseph A. (2008). A Guide to the Dead Sea Scrolls and Related Literature. Grand Rapids, MI: William B. Eerdmans Publishing Company. ISBN 9780802862419.
- Hayes, Christine (2015). Introduction to the Bible. Yale University Press. ISBN 978-0300188271.
- Larkin, Katrina J. A. (2007). "37. Zechariah". In Barton, John; Muddiman, John (eds.). The Oxford Bible Commentary (first (paperback) ed.). Oxford University Press. pp. 610–615. ISBN 978-0199277186.
- Mason, Rex (1993). "Zechariah, The Book of.". In Metzger, Bruce M; Coogan, Michael D (eds.). The Oxford Companion to the Bible. Oxford University Press. ISBN 978-0195046458.
- Rogerson, John W. (2003). "Zechariah". In Dunn, James D. G.; Rogerson, John William (eds.). Eerdmans Commentary on the Bible (illustrated ed.). Wm. B. Eerdmans Publishing. pp. 721–729. ISBN 978-0802837110.
- Ulrich, Eugene, ed. (2010). The Biblical Qumran Scrolls: Transcriptions and Textual Variants. Brill.
- Würthwein, Ernst (1995). The Text of the Old Testament. Translated by Rhodes, Erroll F. Grand Rapids, MI: Wm. B. Eerdmans. ISBN 0-8028-0788-7.
