= Jeremiah 31 =

Book of Jeremiah, chapter 31

- ← chapter 30 chapter 32 →
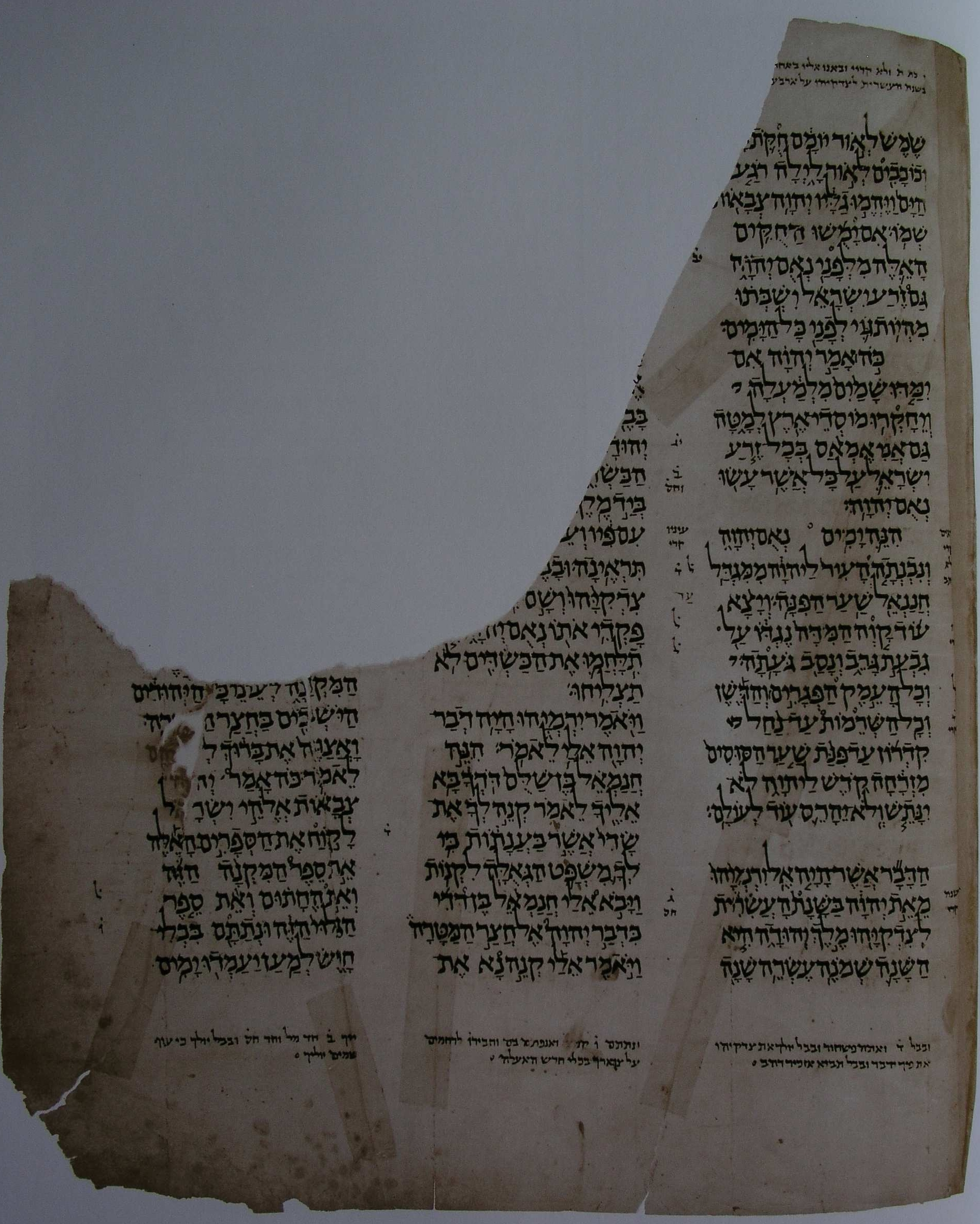
- Partially torn page from Jeremiah (31:34 - 32:14) of the Aleppo Codex from a facsimile edition.
- Book: Book of Jeremiah
- Hebrew Bible part: Nevi'im
- Order in the Hebrew part: 6
- Category: Latter Prophets
- Christian Bible part: Old Testament
- Order in the Christian part: 24

Jeremiah 31 is the thirty-first chapter of the Book of Jeremiah in the Hebrew Bible or the Old Testament of the Christian Bible. It is numbered as Jeremiah 38 in the Septuagint. The book contains prophecies attributed to the prophet Jeremiah, and is one of the Books of the Prophets (Nevi'im). This chapter is notable for the passage about the "New Covenant" (31:31-34) of God with His restored people and the quoting of 31:15 in the “Massacre of the Innocents" narrative (Gospel of Matthew 2:16-18). The Jerusalem Bible refers to chapters 30 and 31 as "the Book of Consolation", and Lutheran theologian Ernst Hengstenberg calls these two chapters "the triumphal hymn of Israel’s salvation". For Annesley William Streane, chapters 30-33 form a unit whose "whole tone" speaks of hope, contrasting with earlier passages marked with melanchony and prophecies of punishment.

== Text ==
The original text of Jeremiah 31 was written in the Hebrew language. This chapter is divided into 40 verses in Christian Bibles, but only 39 verses in the Hebrew Bible, because verse 31:1 in Christian Bibles is verse 30:25 in Hebrew Bibles. This article follows the common numbering in Christian English Bible versions, with notes to the numbering in Hebrew Bible versions.

=== Textual witnesses ===
Some early manuscripts containing this chapter in Hebrew are of the Masoretic Text tradition, which includes the Codex Cairensis (895), the Petersburg Codex of the Prophets (916), Aleppo Codex (10th century; since 1947 only verses 34-38 are extant), Codex Leningradensis (1008). Some fragments containing parts of this chapter were found among the Dead Sea Scrolls, i.e., 4QJer^{c} (4Q72; 1st century BC), with extant verses 1–14, 19-26 (similar to Masoretic Text).

Ancient manuscripts in Greek containing this chapter are mainly of the Septuagint version, including Codex Vaticanus (B; $\mathfrak{G}$^{B}; 4th century), Codex Sinaiticus (S; BHK: $\mathfrak{G}$^{S}; 4th century), Codex Alexandrinus (A; $\mathfrak{G}$^{A}; 5th century) and Codex Marchalianus (Q; $\mathfrak{G}$^{Q}; 6th century).

=== Verse numbering ===
The order of chapters and verses of the Book of Jeremiah in the English Bibles, Masoretic Text (Hebrew), and Vulgate (Latin), in some places differs from that in the Septuagint (LXX, the Greek Bible used in the Eastern Orthodox Church and others) according to Rahlfs or Brenton. The following table is taken with minor adjustments from Brenton's Septuagint, page 971.

The order of Computer Assisted Tools for Septuagint/Scriptural Study (CATSS) based on Alfred Rahlfs' Septuaginta (1935) differs in some details from Joseph Ziegler's critical edition (1957) in Göttingen LXX. Swete's Introduction mostly agrees with Rahlfs edition (=CATSS).

Hebrew	Vulgate, English	Rahlfs' LXX (CATSS)	Brenton's LXX
30:25-31:39	31:1-40	38:1-34,36,37,35,38-40	38:1-40
48:1-45		31:1-45	
48:45-47		none	

== Parashot ==
The parashah sections listed here are based on the Aleppo Codex, and those in the missing parts of the codex (since 1947) are from Kimhi's notes, marked with an asterisk (*). Jeremiah 31 is a part of the Eleventh prophecy (Jeremiah 30-31) in the Consolations (Jeremiah 30-33) section. As mentioned in the "Text" section, verses 30:25-31:39 in the Hebrew Bible below are numbered as 31:1-40 in the Christian Bible. {P}: open parashah; {S}: closed parashah.

[{S*} 30:23-25] {S*} 31:1-5 {P*} 31:6-8 {P*} 31:9-13 {P*} 31:14 {S*} 31:15-19 {S*} 31:20-21 {P*} 31:22-25 {S*} 31:26-29 {S*} 31:30-33 {S*} 31:34-35 {S} 31:36 {S} 31:37-39 {P}

== A remnant returns (31:1–26) ==
This part displays some 'pictures of the restored people', opened with 'a variation of the covenant-formula (verse 1; cf. Jeremiah 30:22) and 'a poetic statement about renewal that lies beyond judgment (verse 2), followed by God's expression of the special love he has set for his people (verse 3). Israel is portrayed as a virgin (verse 4), in contrast to the previous imagery as "prostitute" (Jeremiah 2:20), leading into images that are 'homely and joyful' (verses 5–6) of the people returning from exile (verses 7−9), followed by an oracle to the nations regarding the blessings of the remnant community as a whole (male and female, young and old, priests and lay people; verses 10–14). Thompson sees verse 1 as a continuation from Jeremiah 20:23–24. The feminine imagery continues with Rachel weeping for her children (verse 15), symbolizing Israel's grief over its losses, which is immediately answered by the future restoration (verses 16–17) as the nation's turning back to God is met by God's turning towards them (verses 18–19) and God's compassion (verse 20). The closing appeal reminds the people of God's continuous call for his people to faithfulness (verses 21–22), and the security from God for the worshipping community (verses 23–25). Verse 26 indicates that the whole vision was given to Jeremiah in a dream.

=== Verse 1 ===
"At the same time," says the Lord, "I will be the God of all the families of Israel, and they shall be My people."

Streane notes that this verse is "virtually a repetition of Jeremiah 30:22" and therefore argues that it should be treated as part of chapter 30. Thompson regards this verse as performing a "double function": to conclude the materials in Jeremiah 30:1–24 and to be a header for the following materials in chapter 31.

=== Verse 7 ===
For thus says the Lord:
"Sing aloud with gladness for Jacob,
and raise shouts for the chief of the nations;
proclaim, give praise, and say,
‘O Lord, save your people,
the remnant of Israel.'"

For "the chief of the nations", an alternative reading offered by Bernhard Duhm and supported by Streane is "on the top of the mountains", as suggested by the mention of mountains in the preceding verses 5 and 6 (the mountains of Samaria ... the hill country of Ephraim).

=== Verse 9 ===
They shall come with weeping,
And with supplications I will lead them.
I will cause them to walk by the rivers of waters,
In a straight way in which they shall not stumble;
For I am a Father to Israel,
And Ephraim is My firstborn.

Streane suggests that the weeping described here (from the Hebrew version) reflects tears of contrition marking the return from exile, but notes that the Septuagint's text has a different tone:

"They went forth with weeping, but with consolation will I bring them back".

=== Verse 15 ===
Thus says the Lord:
"A voice is heard in Ramah,

lamentation and bitter weeping.

Rachel is weeping for her children;

she refuses to be comforted for her children,
because they are no more."

“Rachel”, Jacob’s wife and the mother of Joseph and Benjamin, is described lamenting her descendants (both northern and southern tribes) carried away to exile for their sins and would be extinct (“no more”; cf. Genesis 42:36), also figuratively grieved when later the children were “brutally murdered” in the area of Bethlehem where she died (Genesis 35:16–20; 48:7). Rachel's weeping could be heard in "Ramah", "where the Judean exiles were gathered before the deportation to Babylon" (Jeremiah 40:1). R. H. Gundry sees the connection between this verse and Matthew 2:18 in the context of hope that "in both cases God promises to turn lamentation into rejoicing".

=== Verse 22 ===
"How long will you gad about,
O you backsliding daughter?
For the Lord has created a new thing in the earth—
A woman shall encompass a man."

"A woman shall encompass a man": This phrase is said to be the basis of the part of a Jewish wedding, where the bride traditionally walks around the groom three or seven times when she arrives at the Chuppah.

== Preamble to the New Covenant (31:27–30) ==
This preamble answers a proverb during the time of exile, which complained that the current generation was suffering for the sins of the previous generation (cf. Ezekiel 18:2), with the statement that God would deal with each generation, and each individual, 'separately and justly'.

== The New Covenant (31:31–34) ==
The New Covenant is a biblical interpretation originally derived from a phrase in the Book of Jeremiah (31:31-34) in the Hebrew Bible (or Old Testament in Christian Bible), and quoted in the chapter 8 of the Epistle to the Hebrews (8:8–13) in the New Testament of Christian Bible.

The Jewish view of the wording "new covenant" is no more than a renewed national commitment to abide by God's laws. In this view, the word new does not refer to a new commitment that replaces a previous one, but rather to an additional and greater level of commitment.

Christians believe that the promised "New Covenant" was instituted at the Last Supper as part of the Eucharist, which in the Gospel of John includes the New Commandment. Based on the Bible teaching that, "For where a testament is, there must also of necessity be the death of the testator. For a testament is of force after men are dead: otherwise it is of no strength at all while the testator liveth," Protestants tend to believe that the New Covenant only came into force with the death of Christ. The commentary to the Roman Catholic New American Bible also affirms that Christ is the "testator whose death puts his will into effect." Christians thus believe that Jesus is the mediator of the New Covenant, and that the Blood of Christ shed at his crucifixion is the required blood of the covenant.

=== Verse 31 ===
"Behold, the days are coming, says the Lord, when I will make a new covenant with the house of Israel and with the house of Judah—

- "New covenant": is translated from Hebrew: ברית חדשה, brit chadashah; the exact phrase is only found here in the entire Hebrew Bible/Old Testament, but Huey notes that "the ideas associated with it are frequently expressed." Kaiser counts "sixteen or seventeen major passages on the new covenant." Thompson holds that this statement can be traced back to the prophet Jeremiah, despite arguments pointing the origin to latter editors, because, in his observation, Jeremiah "was in the verge of stating the doctrine on a number of occasions."

=== Verse 32 ===
not according to the covenant that I made with their fathers in the day that I took them by the hand to lead them out of the land of Egypt, My covenant which they broke, though I was a husband to them, says the Lord.

- "The covenant that I made with their fathers": refers to the Mosaic Covenant between God and the people of Israel right after they were liberated from the bondage in Egypt (Exodus 19–24).
- "Husband to them": describing Yahweh as a husband (ba'al) to the people of Israel, carrying the image of contractual "husband-wife relationship between Yahweh and Israel." The phrase "though I was a husband to them" is in Masoretic, Targum and Vulgate versions, whereas the Septuagint and Syriac versions have "and I turned away from them."

=== Verse 33 ===
But this shall be the covenant that I will make with the house of Israel; After those days, saith the LORD, I will put my law in their inward parts, and write it in their hearts; and will be their God, and they shall be my people.

- "Put my law in their inward parts": Instead of putting the law on stone tablets (Exodus 31:18; Deuteronomy 4:13), God will put his law in "inward parts" (qereb; "inmost being" or "minds") and "hearts" (see Jeremiah 17:1–2; Romans 7:4–6; 2 Corinthians 3:3, 6–16).

=== Verse 34 ===
No more shall every man teach his neighbor, and every man his brother, saying, ‘Know the Lord,’ for they all shall know Me, from the least of them to the greatest of them, says the Lord. For I will forgive their iniquity, and their sin I will remember no more."

- "For they shall all know me": "The universal knowledge of God" will be a result of the "new covenant".

== The results of the New Covenant (31:35–40) ==
The subsequent two passages affirm that 'the New Covenant will be everlasting' (verses 35–37) and, as a result of it, 'the city of Jerusalem will be rebuilt' (verses 38–40).

=== Verse 38 ===
"Behold, the days come, saith the Lord, that the city shall be built to the Lord from the tower of Hananeel unto the gate of the corner."

- "Tower of Hananeel": might be located at the northeast corner of Jerusalem (Nehemiah 3:1; Nehemiah 12:39; Zechariah 14:10). As "Hananeel" (or "Hananel") means "God's grace", Schroeder notes that the Tower of Hananeel "metaphorically designates" the apostles and first believers who were "strengthened like a tower by the grace of the Holy Spirit descending on them on the Day of Pentecost with a visible sign" (Acts 2:3).
- "Gate of the corner" (Corner Gate): was to the northwest of Jerusalem (2 Kings 14:13; Zechariah 14:10), a part of expansion to the northwest side of the city under Uzziah and Hezekiah.

This verse gives an exilic hope, that Jerusalem will be 'rebuilt beyond its former borders to accommodate the population explosion among its inhabitants', and that the city 'will never again be uprooted or overthrown'.

== See also ==
- Egypt
- Gareb
- Goath
- Israel
- Judah
- Old Testament messianic prophecies quoted in the New Testament
- Rachel
- Ramah
- Related Bible parts: Nehemiah 3, Nehemiah 12, Zechariah 14, Matthew 2, Hebrews 8

== Sources ==
- Finfer, Pesah (1906). Masoret HaTorah VehaNevi'im. Vilna, (Hebrew). Online text: DjVu at Commons, (PDF)
- Huey, F. B. (1993). The New American Commentary - Jeremiah, Lamentations: An Exegetical and Theological Exposition of Holy Scripture, NIV Text. B&H Publishing Group. ISBN 9780805401165.
- McConville, Gordon (1994). "Jeremiah". In Carson, D. A.; France, R. T.; Motyer, J. A.; Wenham, G. J. (eds.). New Bible Commentary: 21st Century Edition (4, illustrated, reprint, revised ed.). Inter-Varsity Press. pp. 671–708. ISBN 9780851106489.
- O'Connor, Kathleen M. (2007). "23. Jeremiah". In Barton, John; Muddiman, John (eds.). The Oxford Bible Commentary (first (paperback) ed.). Oxford University Press. pp. 487–533. ISBN 978-0199277186.
- Ofer, Yosef (1992). "The Aleppo Codex and the Bible of R. Shalom Shachna Yellin" in Rabbi Mordechai Breuer Festschrift: Collected Papers in Jewish Studies, ed. M. Bar-Asher, 1:295-353. Jerusalem (in Hebrew). Online text (PDF)
- Thompson, J. A. (1980). A Book of Jeremiah. The New International Commentary on the Old Testament (illustrated, revised ed.). Wm. B. Eerdmans Publishing. ISBN 9780802825308.
- Würthwein, Ernst (1995). The Text of the Old Testament. Translated by Rhodes, Erroll F. Grand Rapids, MI: Wm. B. Eerdmans. ISBN 978-0-8028-0788-5.
