= Zechariah 12 =

Bible chapter

- ← chapter 11 chapter 13 →
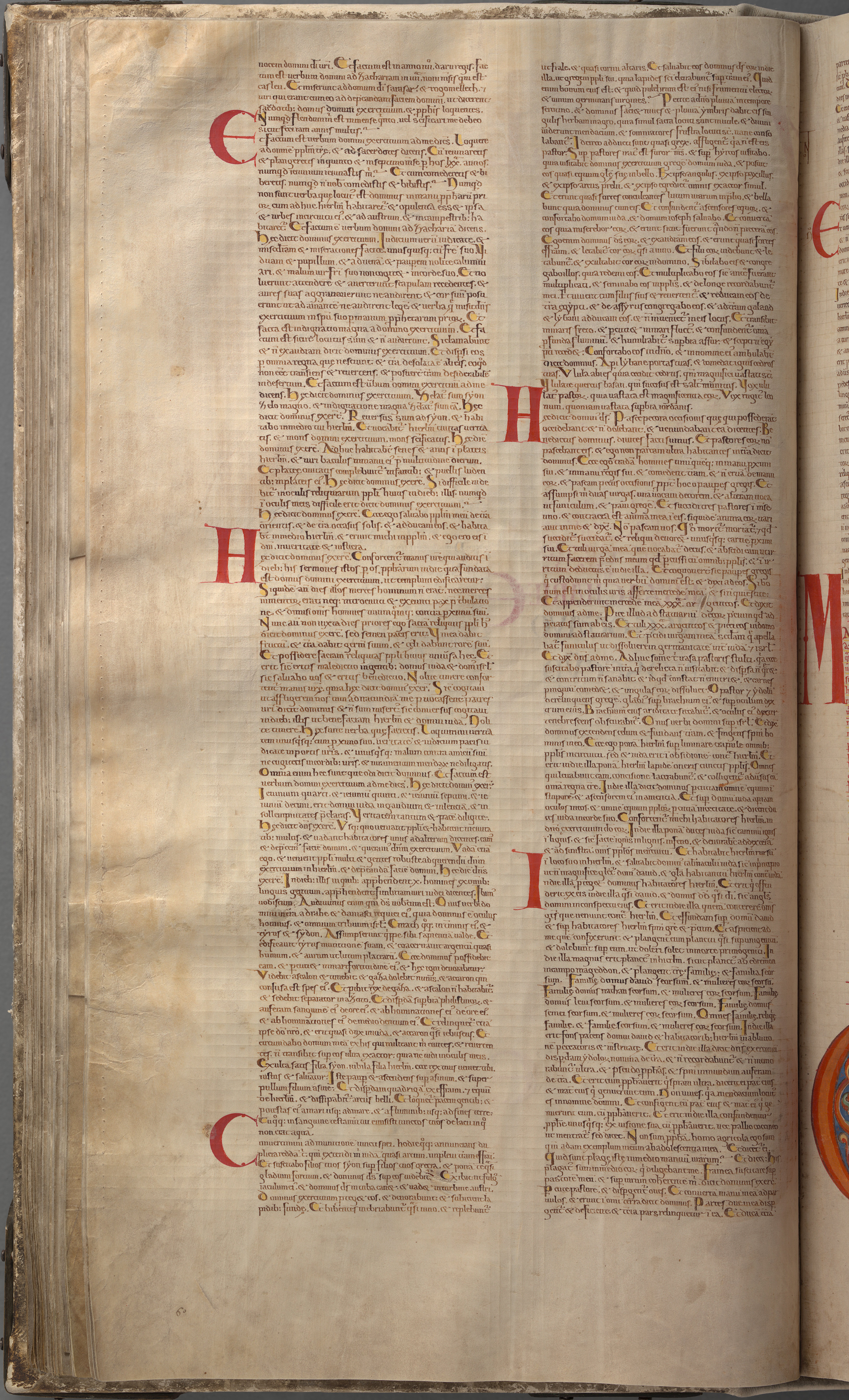
- Book of Zechariah (6:15-13:9) in Latin in Codex Gigas, made around 13th century.
- Book: Book of Zechariah
- Category: Nevi'im
- Christian Bible part: Old Testament
- Order in the Christian part: 38

Zechariah 12 is the twelfth of the 14 chapters in the Book of Zechariah in the Hebrew Bible and the Old Testament of the Christian Bible. This book contains the prophecies attributed to the prophet Zechariah. In the Hebrew Bible, it is part of the Book of the Twelve Minor Prophets. This chapter is a part of a section (so-called "Second Zechariah") consisting of Zechariah 9–14. The New Testament allusion to "the one whom they have pierced" (John 19:37) is drawn from this chapter.

== Text ==
The original text was written in the Hebrew language. This chapter is divided into 14 verses.

=== Textual witnesses ===
Some early manuscripts containing the text of this chapter in Hebrew are of the Masoretic Text, which includes the Codex Cairensis (from year 895), the Petersburg Codex of the Prophets (916), Aleppo Codex (930), and Codex Leningradensis (1008). Fragments containing parts of this chapter were found among the Dead Sea Scrolls, including 4Q80 (4QXII^{e}; 75–50 BCE) with extant verses 7–12. and 4Q82 (4QXII^{g}; 50–25 BCE) with extant verses 1–3.

There is also a translation into Koine Greek known as the Septuagint, made in the last few centuries BCE. Extant ancient manuscripts of the Septuagint version include Codex Vaticanus (B; $\mathfrak{G}$^{B}; 4th century), Codex Sinaiticus (S; BHK: $\mathfrak{G}$^{S}; 4th century), Codex Alexandrinus (A; $\mathfrak{G}$^{A}; 5th century) and Codex Marchalianus (Q; $\mathfrak{G}$^{Q}; 6th century).

== Structure ==
This chapter and chapter 13 verses 1–6 are a section, forming a three-section "entity" with 13:7–9 and 14:1-21. The New King James Version divides this chapter into two parts:

- Zechariah 12:1–9 = The Coming Deliverance of Judah
- Zechariah 12:10–14 = Mourning for the Pierced One. (Note: Section headings are capitalised in the New King James Version)

== The Coming Deliverance of Judah (verses 1–9) ==
This section contains an oracle or prophecy "concerning Israel", focusing on "the final onslaught of all nations on Jerusalem".

=== Verse 1 ===
The burden of the word of the Lord against Israel. Thus says the Lord, who stretches out the heavens, lays the foundation of the earth, and forms the spirit of man within him:

"Burden" here means "oracle" or "prophecy", similarly in Zechariah 9:1 and Malachi 1:1. This verse contains the heading of the oracle which, to biblical writer Katrina Larkin, "seems to cover the whole of the rest of the book" (chapters 12–14), with a "doxology on creation" bringing ideas about "creation and origins" (the Urzeit) projected forwards onto the "end of time" (the Endzeit).

=== Verse 2 ===
Behold, I am about to make Jerusalem a cup of staggering to all the surrounding peoples. The siege of Jerusalem will also be against Judah.

There is a similar image in Isaiah 51:17: You ... have drunk from the hand of the Lord, the cup of his wrath, who have drunk to the dregs, the bowl, the cup of staggering. Theologian Albert Barnes comments that "the image of the 'cup' is mostly of God's displeasure, which is given to His own people, and then, His judgment of chastisement being exceeded, given in turn to those who had been the instruments of giving it".

== Mourning for the Pierced One (verses 10–14) ==
The mourning in this section is based on the piercing of the LORD, who is the only one speaking in the first person throughout chapters 12 to 14; first compared to the loss of an only (or firstborn) son (verse 10), then to the death of king Josiah in the "plain of Megiddo" (verse 11; cf. 2 Chronicles 35:20–25; 2 Kings 23:29–30; traced to Jeremiah in 2 Chronicles 35:25); and the mourning spreading from Jerusalem to the entire land (verse 12) following by the references to particular subgroups or clans in the community even further according to the gender ("wives" separated from the "husbands"; verses 12–14).

=== Verse 10 ===
And I will pour upon the house of David,
and upon the inhabitants of Jerusalem,
the spirit of grace and of supplications:
and they shall look upon me whom they have pierced,
and they shall mourn for him,
as one mourneth for his only son,
and shall be in bitterness for him,
as one that is in bitterness for his firstborn.

- "They shall look upon me whom they have pierced" The speaker in first person is Yahweh (throughout chapters 12 to 14). To "look upon or unto" implies trust, longing, and reverence (compare Numbers 21:9; 2 Kings 3:14; Psalm 34:5; Isaiah 22:11). For some preterist interpreters of the New Testament, the literal fulfilment of this piercing, i.e. slaying (Zechariah 13:3; Lamentations 4:9) happened when the Romans crucified Jesus, such as Paul wrote about the crucifixion of "the Lord of glory" (1 Corinthians 2:8), and requested the Ephesian elders to "feed the Church of God, which he hath purchased with his own blood" (Acts 20:28); also John (John 19:37) links these words to the same event (cf. Revelation 1:7). The Greek Septuagint renders Ἐπιβλέψονται πρὸς μὲ ἀνθ ῶν κατωχρήσαντο, "They shall look to me because they insulted," whereas Vulgate has Aspicient ad me quem confixerunt.
- "Me … him": The change of person is due to Yahweh speaking in His own person first, then the prophet speaking of "him". Later Jewish literature refers the "pierced" one to be Messiah Ben (son of) Joseph, who was to suffer in the battle with Gog, before Messiah Ben David should come to reign.
- "As one mourneth for his only son... for his firstborn": The depth and poignancy of this mourning are expressed by a double comparison, the grief felt at the loss of an only son, and of the firstborn. Among the Hebrews the preservation of the family was deemed of vast importance, and its extinction regarded as a punishment and a curse, so that the death of an only son would be the heaviest blow that could happen (see Isaiah 47:9; Jeremiah 6:26; Amos 8:10). Peculiar privileges belonged to the firstborn, and his loss would be estimated accordingly (see Genesis 49:3; Exodus 4:22; Deuteronomy 21:17; Micah 6:7). The mention of "piercing," just above, seems to connect the passage with the Passover solemnities and the destruction of the firstborn of the Egyptians.
- "In bitterness for him": as one that is "in bitterness for his firstborn".

=== Verse 11 ===
In that day shall there be a great mourning in Jerusalem,
as the mourning of Hadadrimmon in the valley of Megiddon.

- "The mourning of (at) Hadadrimmon in the valley of Megiddon": This is generally supposed to refer to the death of King Josiah of a wound received at Megiddo, in the battle with Pharaoh-Necho (609 BC), and to the national lamentation made for him, long observed on the anniversary of the calamity (see 2 Kings 23:29; 2 Chronicles 35:20–25). Jerome identified Hadadrimmon with a place in the Plain of Megiddo, near Jezreel, and known in his day by the name of Maximianopolis, now Rummaneh, seven miles northwest of Jezreel, on the southern edge of the Plain of Esdraelon, but the identification is far from certain.

=== Verse 12 ===
And the land shall mourn, every family apart;
the family of the house of David apart, and their wives apart;
the family of the house of Nathan apart, and their wives apart;

- "David... Nathan" First the royal family is mentioned generally, to show that no one, however, high in station, is exempted from this mourning; and then a particular branch is named to individualize the lamentation. Nathan is that son of David from whom descended Zerubbabel (1 Chronicles 3:5; Luke 3:27–31).
- "Nathan": A branch from Nathan, a son of David and whole brother of Solomon 1 Chronicles 3:5, in the ancestral line of Jesus (Luke 3:31).
- "Their wives apart." In private life the females of a household dwelt in apartments separate from the males, and in public functions the genders were equally kept distinct (see Exodus 15:20; Judges 11:34; 1 Samuel 18:6; 2 Samuel 6:5).

=== Verse 13 ===
The family of the house of Levi apart, and their wives apart;
the family of Shimei apart, and their wives apart;

- "Levi... Shimei": The priestly family is generally mentioned first, and then individualized by naming Shimei, the son of Gershon, and grandson of Levi (Numbers 3:17, 18, 21). The LXX (Septuagint), Syriac Peshitta, and Arabic versions, read "the family of Simeon" or "the tribe of Simeon," instead of "the family of Shimei," but there is no known reason to mention this tribe.

== See also ==
- Armageddon
- David
- Hadad § Hadad in Aram and ancient Israel
- Jesus and Messianic prophecy
- Levites (house of Levi)
- Nathan
- Shimei
- Related Bible parts: 2 Samuel 5, 1 Chronicles 3, Psalm 22, Isaiah 53, Matthew 27, Luke 3, John 19, Revelation 1, Revelation 16

== Sources ==
- Boda, Mark J. (2016). Harrison, R. K.; Hubbard, Jr, Robert L. (eds.). The Book of Zechariah. New International Commentary on the Old Testament. Wm. B. Eerdmans Publishing. ISBN 978-0802823755.
- Collins, John J. (2014). Introduction to the Hebrew Scriptures. Fortress Press. ISBN 9781451469233.
- Coogan, Michael David (2007). Coogan, Michael David; Brettler, Marc Zvi; Newsom, Carol Ann; Perkins, Pheme (eds.). The New Oxford Annotated Bible with the Apocryphal/Deuterocanonical Books: New Revised Standard Version, Issue 48 (Augmented 3rd ed.). Oxford University Press. ISBN 9780195288810.
- Fitzmyer, Joseph A. (2008). A Guide to the Dead Sea Scrolls and Related Literature. Grand Rapids, MI: William B. Eerdmans Publishing Company. ISBN 9780802862419.
- Floyd, Michael H. (2000). Minor Prophets, Part 2. Forms of the Old Testament Literature. Vol. 22. Wm. B. Eerdmans Publishing. ISBN 978-0802844521.
- Hayes, Christine (2015). Introduction to the Bible. Yale University Press. ISBN 978-0300188271.
- Larkin, Katrina J. A. (2007). "37. Zechariah". In Barton, John; Muddiman, John (eds.). The Oxford Bible Commentary (first (paperback) ed.). Oxford University Press. pp. 610–615. ISBN 978-0199277186.
- Mason, Rex (1993). "Zechariah, The Book of.". In Metzger, Bruce M; Coogan, Michael D (eds.). The Oxford Companion to the Bible. Oxford University Press. ISBN 978-0195046458.
- Ulrich, Eugene, ed. (2010). The Biblical Qumran Scrolls: Transcriptions and Textual Variants. Brill.
- Würthwein, Ernst (1995). The Text of the Old Testament. Translated by Rhodes, Erroll F. Grand Rapids, MI: Wm. B. Eerdmans. ISBN 0-8028-0788-7.
