= Zechariah 9 =

Bible chapter

- ← chapter 8 chapter 10 →
- The last five extant folios of the Book of the Twelve Minor Prophets in the Aleppo Codex (10th century), which include parts of Zephaniah and Zechariah, and the entire text of Malachi.
- Book: Book of Zechariah
- Category: Nevi'im
- Christian Bible part: Old Testament
- Order in the Christian part: 38

Zechariah 9 is the ninth of the 14 chapters in the Book of Zechariah in the Hebrew Bible or the Old Testament of the Christian Bible. This book contains the prophecies attributed to the prophet Zechariah. In the Hebrew Bible it is part of the Book of the Twelve Minor Prophets. This chapter opens the so-called "Second Zechariah" portion, consisting of Zechariah 9–14, which was composed "long after the previous portions of the book". It concerns the advance of an enemy (cf. oracles in Amos and Ezekiel), but God defends Jerusalem and promises that his king (verse 9) will triumphantly enter the city to bring peace among all nations. This chapter also contains a continuation of the subject in the seventh chapter. The oracle referring to the king's entry into Jerusalem (verses 9 and 10) is quoted in the New Testament in the accounts of Jesus' triumphal entry into Jerusalem (Matthew 21, John 12).

== Text ==
The original text was written in the Hebrew language. This chapter is divided into 17 verses.

=== Textual witnesses ===
Some early manuscripts containing the text of this chapter in Hebrew are of the Masoretic Text, which includes the Codex Cairensis (from year 895), the Petersburg Codex of the Prophets (916), Aleppo Codex (930), (Note: The Aleppo Codex now only contains Zechariah 9:17b–14:21.) and Codex Leningradensis (1008).

There is also a translation into Koine Greek known as the Septuagint, made in the last few centuries BCE. Extant ancient manuscripts of the Septuagint version include Codex Vaticanus (B; $\mathfrak{G}$^{B}; 4th century), Codex Sinaiticus (S; BHK: $\mathfrak{G}$^{S}; 4th century), Codex Alexandrinus (A; $\mathfrak{G}$^{A}; 5th century) and Codex Marchalianus (Q; $\mathfrak{G}$^{Q}; 6th century). Fragments containing parts of this chapter (a revision of the Septuagint) were found among the Dead Sea Scrolls, i.e., Naḥal Ḥever 8Ḥev1 (8ḤevXII^{gr}); late 1st century BCE) with extant verses 1–5.

== Oracles on foreign nations (verses 1–8) ==
This section contains some 'wisdom influence', such as the 'eye' motif (cf. Job 42:5, and earlier in Zechariah), which 'binds the book together', in verses 1 and 8, as well as many allusions to earlier prophets including Amos, Ezekiel, and Isaiah. There is a geographic movement from north to south as the word of the Lord moves from Syria or Aram (verse 1) to Jerusalem ("my house"; verse 8).

=== Verse 1 ===
The burden of the word of the Lord in the land of Hadrach,

and Damascus shall be the rest thereof: when the eyes of man, as of all the tribes of Israel, shall be toward the Lord.

The opening words of this verse form a new heading consistent with the separation of chapters 9-14 from the previous chapters: cf. the wording in the New International Version:

A prophecy.

The word of the Lord is against the land of Hadrak ...

The opening word "burden", meaning "oracle" or "prophecy", appears in the same manner in Zechariah 12:1 and Malachi 1:1. "Hadrach" refers to a city-state in the northern region of Syria, stretching from south of Aleppo to north of Damascus. The place is not mentioned elsewhere in the Bible.

There are two typical readings of the second part of this verse: some texts, as above, refer to "the eyes of man", or of "all humanity", which are turned towards the LORD. Others refer to the eye as God's eye:

For the Lord has an eye on mankind and on all the tribes of Israel.

=== Verse 8 ===
Then I will encamp at my house as a guard,

so that none shall march to and fro;

no oppressor shall again march over them,

for now I see with my own eyes.

- "As a guard" (ESV; KJV: "because of the army"): from Hebrew: מצבה, a hapax legomenon; it can be read as מִצָּבָה (mitsavah), following Masoretic Text, from נָצַב, natsav, "take a stand", or מַצֵּבָה (matsevah, "pillar"); bearing 'the idea of the Lord as a protector'.

== King of peace (verses 9–10) ==
This section describes "the king of peace", drawn partly from 'Jacob's blessing of Judah' (Genesis 49:10–11) and partly from Psalm 72:8. It is the first of several passages which Katrina Larkin refers to as "linking passages" which "bind chapters 9 to 14 together": see Book of Zechariah#Chapters 9 to 14.

=== Verse 9 ===
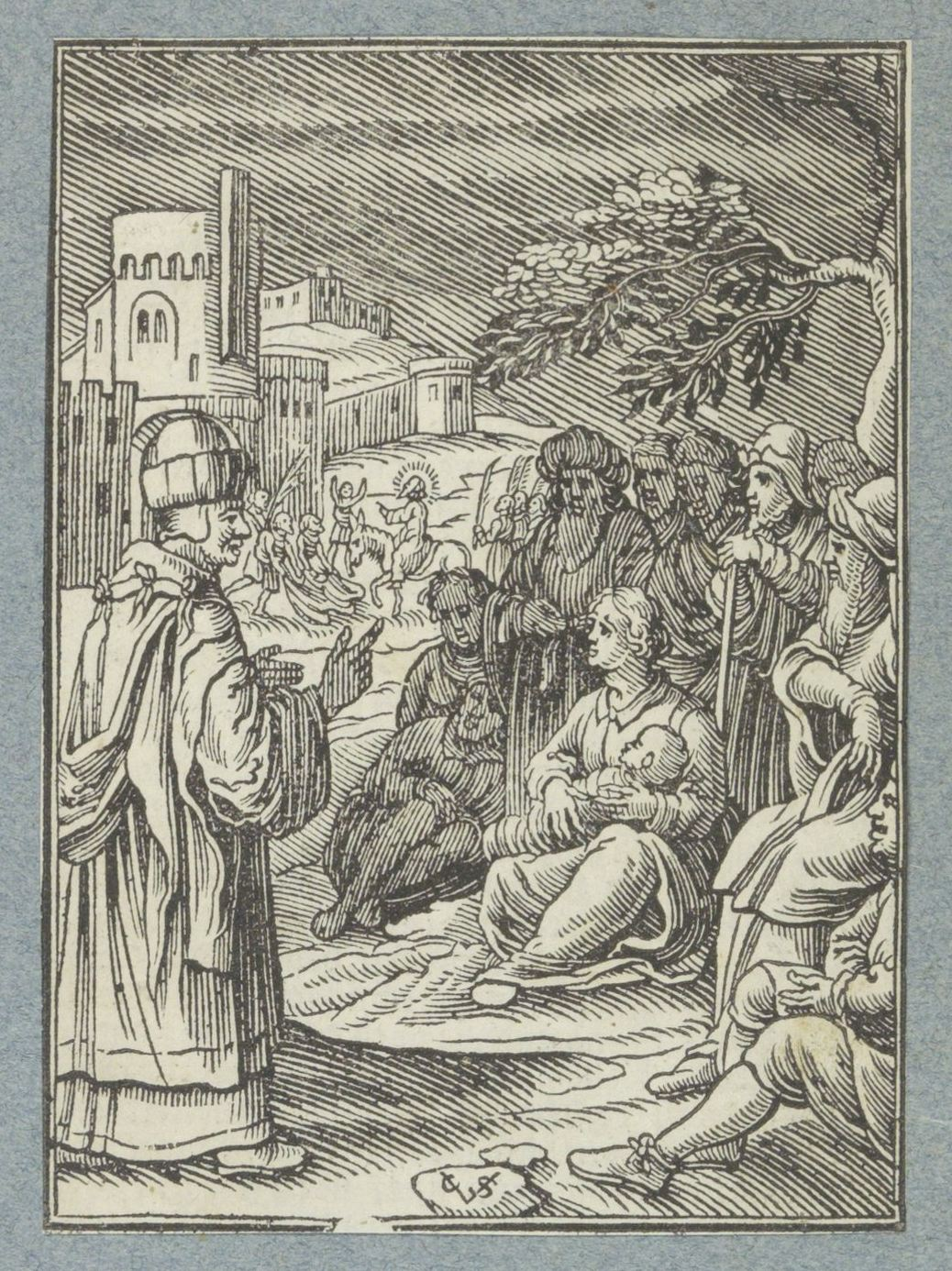
Zechariah is delivering the prophecy of the King coming to Jerusalem, with the background of Jesus riding on an ass entering into Jerusalem and people spreading their clothes before him, waving palm branches. Illustration by Christoffel van Sichem (1645–1646).

Rejoice greatly, O daughter of Zion;

shout, O daughter of Jerusalem:

behold, thy King cometh unto thee:

he is just, and having salvation;

lowly, and riding upon an ass,

and upon a colt the foal of an ass.

- "Ass" (KJV; NRSV: "donkey") and "colt": point to one animal in the 'style of Hebrew parallelism' (cf. Genesis 49:11; John 12:14–15), indicating 'peaceful intentions', in contrast to "horse" (or "war-horse") in verse 10.

The New Testament authors saw this verse as a prophecy pointing to Jesus' triumphal entry into Jerusalem on the day now known as Palm Sunday, as quoted in Matthew 21:5 and John 12:15).

=== Verse 10 ===
And I will cut off the chariot from Ephraim,

and the horse from Jerusalem,

and the battle bow shall be cut off:

and he shall speak peace unto the heathen:

and his dominion shall be from sea even to sea,

and from the river even to the ends of the earth.

- "The river": points to the Euphrates in northern Syria.

== God will save his people (verses 11–17) ==
This part pictures God as a warrior who brings "ultimate victory to his oppressed people against the Greeks" (verse 13). Some translations refer to Javan, traditionally considered the ancestor of the Greeks.

== Musical adaptation ==
Verses 9–10 (from the King James Version) are quoted in the English-language oratorio "Messiah" by George Frideric Handel (HWV 56).

== See also ==
- Ashdod
- Ashkelon
- Damascus
- Ekron
- Ephraim
- Gaza
- Hadrach
- Hamath
- Jebusite
- Jerusalem
- Jesus and Messianic prophecy
- Philistine
- Sidon
- Triumphal entry into Jerusalem
- Tyre
- Zion
- Related Bible parts: Isaiah 62, Matthew 21, Mark 11, Luke 19, John 12

== Sources ==
- Boda, Mark J. (2016). Harrison, R. K.; Hubbard, Jr, Robert L. (eds.). The Book of Zechariah. New International Commentary on the Old Testament. Wm. B. Eerdmans Publishing. ISBN 978-0802823755.
- Collins, John J. (2014). Introduction to the Hebrew Scriptures. Fortress Press. ISBN 9781451469233.
- Coogan, Michael David (2007). Coogan, Michael David; Brettler, Marc Zvi; Newsom, Carol Ann; Perkins, Pheme (eds.). The New Oxford Annotated Bible with the Apocryphal/Deuterocanonical Books: New Revised Standard Version, Issue 48 (Augmented 3rd ed.). Oxford University Press. ISBN 9780195288810.
- Fitzmyer, Joseph A. (2008). A Guide to the Dead Sea Scrolls and Related Literature. Grand Rapids, MI: William B. Eerdmans Publishing Company. ISBN 9780802862419.
- Hayes, Christine (2015). Introduction to the Bible. Yale University Press. ISBN 978-0300188271.
- Larkin, Katrina J. A. (2007). "37. Zechariah". In Barton, John; Muddiman, John (eds.). The Oxford Bible Commentary (first (paperback) ed.). Oxford University Press. pp. 610–615. ISBN 978-0199277186.
- Mason, Rex (1993). "Zechariah, The Book of.". In Metzger, Bruce M; Coogan, Michael D (eds.). The Oxford Companion to the Bible. Oxford University Press. ISBN 978-0195046458.
- Würthwein, Ernst (1995). The Text of the Old Testament. Translated by Rhodes, Erroll F. Grand Rapids, MI: Wm. B. Eerdmans. ISBN 0-8028-0788-7.
