= Zechariah 14 =

Chapter of the Book of Zechariah

- ← chapter 13 Malachi 1 →
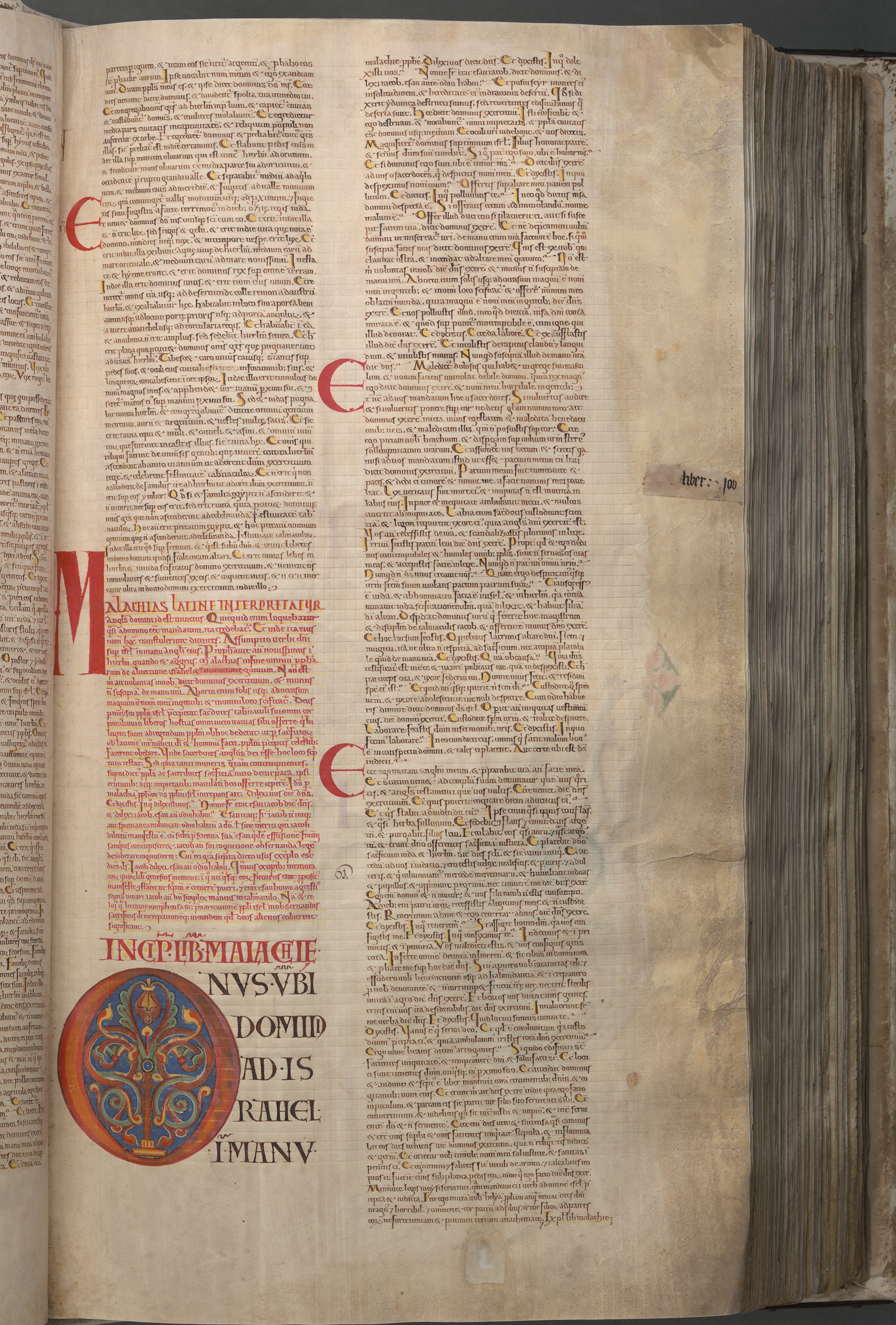
- Book of Zechariah (13:9-14:21) in Latin in Codex Gigas, made around 13th century.
- Book: Book of Zechariah
- Category: Nevi'im
- Christian Bible part: Old Testament
- Order in the Christian part: 38

Zechariah 14 is the fourteenth and final chapter of the Book of Zechariah in the Hebrew Bible and the Old Testament of the Christian Bible. The book contains the prophecies during the sixth century BCE attributed to the prophet Zechariah. In the Hebrew Bible it is part of the Book of the Twelve Minor Prophets. This chapter is a part of a section—so-called "Second Zechariah"—consisting of Zechariah 9–14. It continues the theme of chapters 12 and 13 about the "war preceding peace for Jerusalem in the eschatological future'" It is written almost entirely in third-person prophetic discourse, with seven references to "that day".

== Text ==
The original text was written in the Biblical Hebrew. This chapter is divided into 21 verses.

=== Textual witnesses ===
Some early manuscripts containing the text of this chapter in Hebrew are of the Masoretic Text, which includes the Codex Cairensis (895 CE), the Petersburg Codex of the Prophets (916), Aleppo Codex (930), and Codex Leningradensis (1008).

Fragments containing parts of this chapter were found among the Dead Sea Scrolls, that is, 4Q76 (4QXII^{a}; mid 2nd century BCE) with extant verses 18.

There is also a translation into Koine Greek known as the Septuagint, made in the last few centuries BCE. Extant ancient manuscripts of the Septuagint version include Codex Vaticanus (B; $\mathfrak{G}$^{B}; 4th century), Codex Sinaiticus (S; BHK: $\mathfrak{G}$^{S}; 4th century), Codex Alexandrinus (A; $\mathfrak{G}$^{A}; 5th century) and Codex Marchalianus (Q; $\mathfrak{G}$^{Q}; 6th century).

== Themes ==
The phrase "that day" occurs seven times in this chapter, having also been used several times in chapters 12 and 13. Biblical scholar Katrina Larkin notes that the phrase has a range of biblical uses, but in Zechariah its meaning is eschatological. Albert Barnes notes that in this chapter, the wording refers back to verse 1, where a literal translation states that "a day is coming, the LORD's". Typically, English translations states that "a day is coming for the LORD".

Sukkot, the Feast of Booths, is singled out in this chapter (verses 16–20) from among the Three Pilgrimage Festivals of Judaism, highlighting its status in the Jewish calendar. The prophet's interest in the fate of the nations who opposed Jerusalem is revealed in the section from verse 12 to verse 19.

== The Day of the Lord (verses 1–15) ==
This section describes God gathering the nations to lay siege to Jerusalem. When half of the population has been exiled, God comes to deliver the city (2–3), defeating those opposing Jerusalem (verses 12–15).

=== Verse 4 ===
And his feet shall stand in that day upon the mount of Olives,
which is before Jerusalem on the east,
and the Mount of Olives shall cleave in the midst thereof
toward the east and toward the west,
and there shall be a very great valley;
and half of the mountain shall remove toward the north,
and half of it toward the south.

- "Mount of Olives": This mount lay to the east of Jerusalem, separated by the deep Kidron Valley, rising to a height of some 600 feet, and intercepting the view of the wilderness of Judaea and the Jordan ghor. It rises 187 feet above Mount Zion, 295 feet above Moriah, 443 feet above Gethsemane, and lies between the city and the wilderness toward the Dead Sea and around its northern side, wound the road to Bethany and the Jordan. This verse is the only place in the Hebrew Bible in which the name is exactly spelled, although it is often alluded to (e.g., 2 Samuel 15:30; 1 Kings 11:7; 2 Kings 23:13, in which it is called "the mount of corruption", etc.). There "upon the mountain, which is on the east side of the city, the glory of the LORD stood," when it had "gone up from the midst of the city" (11:23). In Christianity, Jesus’s entry into Jerusalem and his ascension to Heaven are believed to have occurred around the Mount of Olives; his prospective Second Coming may occur there, as well.
- "Shall cleave in the midst thereof": The cleaving of the mountain in two is by a fissure or valley (a prolongation of the "valley of Jehoshaphat" or "valley of decision" (Joel 3:2), extending from Jerusalem on the west towards the Jordan River, eastward. It provides an escape route for the besieged (Joel 3:12–14). Half the divided mountain is thereby forced northward, half southward; the valley running between.

=== Verse 5 ===
And ye shall flee to the valley of the mountains;
for the valley of the mountains shall reach unto Azal:
yea, ye shall flee, like as ye fled from before the earthquake in the days of Uzziah, king of Judah:
and the LORD my God shall come, and all the saints with thee.

Amos prophesied in the 8th century BCE (Amos 1:1), two years before "the earthquake in the days of Uzziah king of Judah". This event was related to the one in which King Uzziah was stricken with leprosy for entering the priest's office, according to Josephus. Josephus wrote that at a place near the city called Eroge, half of the mountain towards the west was broken, rolled then stood half a mile towards the eastern part, up to the king's gardens.

=== Verse 10 ===
All the land shall be turned as a plain from Geba to Rimmon south of Jerusalem:
and it shall be lifted up, and inhabited in her place,
from Benjamin's gate unto the place of the first gate, unto the corner gate,
and from the tower of Hananeel unto the king's winepresses.

- "Corner Gate": was to the northwest of Jerusalem (2 Kings 14:13 and Jeremiah 31:38), a part of the expansion to the northwest side of the city under Kings Uzziah and Hezekiah.
- "Tower of Hananeel": a well-known landmark that is mentioned also in Nehemiah 3:1, Nehemiah 12:39, and Jeremiah 31:38, standing midway between "the sheep gate" and "the fish gate", at the northeast corner of Jerusalem, then from this point, the wall which had run northwestern from the sheep gate now turned to west.

== The nations worship the king, the LORD of hosts (verses 16–19) ==
In the end times, the survivors among the gentile nations are called upon to come annually to Jerusalem to celebrate Sukkot, the Feast of Tabernacles. Those who do not come will be punished with no rain (verse 17) and with plague (verses 12–15).

== The sanctification of all things (verses 20–21) ==
According to the final words of the book, the prophet "foresees the sanctification of everything in the land of Israel". These verses depict a "sanctified Jerusalem in [a] ritual sense".

== See also ==
- Arabah-Jordan
- Geba
- Jerusalem
- Mount of Olives
- Tower of Hananeel
- Related Bible parts: Amos 1, Zechariah 13, Luke 24, Acts 1

== Sources ==
- Boda, Mark J. (2016). Harrison, R. K.; Hubbard, Jr, Robert L. (eds.). The Book of Zechariah. New International Commentary on the Old Testament. Wm. B. Eerdmans Publishing. ISBN 978-0802823755.
- Collins, John J. (2014). Introduction to the Hebrew Scriptures. Fortress Press. ISBN 9781451469233.
- Coogan, Michael David (2007). Coogan, Michael David; Brettler, Marc Zvi; Newsom, Carol Ann; Perkins, Pheme (eds.). The New Oxford Annotated Bible with the Apocryphal/Deuterocanonical Books: New Revised Standard Version, Issue 48 (Augmented 3rd ed.). Oxford University Press. ISBN 9780195288810.
- Fitzmyer, Joseph A. (2008). A Guide to the Dead Sea Scrolls and Related Literature. Grand Rapids, MI: William B. Eerdmans Publishing Company. ISBN 9780802862419.
- Hayes, Christine (2015). Introduction to the Bible. Yale University Press. ISBN 978-0300188271.
- Larkin, Katrina J. A. (2007). "37. Zechariah". In Barton, John; Muddiman, John (eds.). The Oxford Bible Commentary (first (paperback) ed.). Oxford University Press. pp. 610–615. ISBN 978-0199277186.
- Mason, Rex (1993). "Zechariah, The Book of.". In Metzger, Bruce M; Coogan, Michael D (eds.). The Oxford Companion to the Bible. Oxford University Press. ISBN 978-0195046458.
- Rogerson, John W. (2003). "Zechariah". In Dunn, James D. G.; Rogerson, John William (eds.). Eerdmans Commentary on the Bible (illustrated ed.). Wm. B. Eerdmans Publishing. pp. 721–729. ISBN 978-0802837110.
- Ulrich, Eugene, ed. (2010). The Biblical Qumran Scrolls: Transcriptions and Textual Variants. Brill.
- Würthwein, Ernst (1995). The Text of the Old Testament. Translated by Rhodes, Erroll F. Grand Rapids, MI: Wm. B. Eerdmans. ISBN 0-8028-0788-7.
