= Goath =

Hill near Jerusalem

Gibeat Goath or the Hill of Death (of roaring, groaning) is a hill near Jerusalem, mentioned in Jeremiah 31:39. Jeremiah predicts (Jer. 31:36-40) that the city should in future times extend beyond the north wall (the second wall) and enclose Gibeat Gareb and Gibeat Goath. The position of Gareb can correspond only with Under Bezetha, and the position of Goath only with Upper Bezetha where Golgotha rose. Both of these elevations were enclosed by Agrippa, as parts of the new city, and lay inside the third wall. From the context we learn that Gareb and Goath were unclean places, but, being measured in with the holy city, became sanctified. That the Goath hill of Jeremiah is identical with the Golgotha of the Evangelists, is more than probable.
