= Hebrews 8 =

- ← chapter 7 chapter 9 →
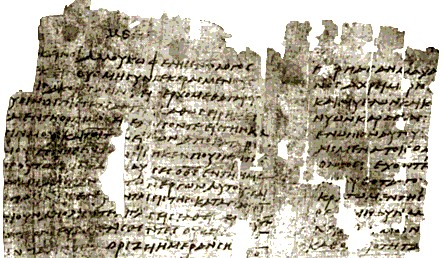
- Epistle to the Hebrews 2:14-5:5; 10:8-22; 10:29-11:13; 11:28-12:17 in Papyrus 13 (AD. 225-250).
- Book: Epistle to the Hebrews
- Category: General epistles
- Christian Bible part: New Testament
- Order in the Christian part: 19

Hebrews 8 is the eighth chapter of the Epistle to the Hebrews in the New Testament of the Christian Bible. The author is anonymous, although the internal reference to "our brother Timothy" (Hebrews 13:23) causes a traditional attribution to Paul, but this attribution has been disputed since the second century and there is no decisive evidence for the authorship. This chapter contains the exposition about the better ministry of the New Covenant.

== Background ==
This chapter appears under the subheading "Jesus, High Priest of a Better Covenant" in the ESV and "Mediator of a Better Covenant" in the NRSV English language translations of the New Testament.

== Text ==
The original text was written in Koine Greek. This chapter is divided into 13 verses.

=== Textual witnesses ===
Some early manuscripts containing the text of this chapter are:

- Papyrus 46 (175–225; complete)
- Codex Vaticanus (325-350)
- Codex Sinaiticus (330-360)
- Codex Alexandrinus (400-440)
- Codex Freerianus (~450; extant verses 1-2, 7-11, 18-20, 27-28)
- Codex Claromontanus (~550)

=== Old Testament references ===
- Hebrews 8:5: Exodus 25:40
- Hebrews 8:10–12: Jeremiah 31:31–34

== The Work of the Heavenly High Priest (8:1–7) ==
This section serves as an introduction to the homily about the New Covenant based on Jeremiah 31:31-34.

=== Verse 1 ===
New King James Version

Now this is the main point of the things we are saying: We have such a High Priest, who is seated at the right hand of the throne of the Majesty in the heavens,

=== Verse 2 ===
New King James Version

Minister of the sanctuary and of the true tabernacle which the Lord erected, and not man.

=== Verse 5 ===
who serve the copy and shadow of the heavenly things, as Moses was divinely instructed when he was about to make the tabernacle. For He said, "See that you make all things according to the pattern shown you on the mountain."

Citing Exodus 25:40

== The Text for a Homily (8:8–13) ==
Following the introduction, oracle in Jeremiah 31:31-34 is discussed as the word of God (according to NRSV; the text of Jeremiah also claims 'the Lord' as the speaker).

=== Verse 13 ===
New King James Version

In that He says, "A new covenant," He has made the first obsolete. Now what is becoming obsolete and growing old is ready to vanish away.

== See also ==
- Abraham
- High priest
- Jesus Christ
- Judah (biblical person)
- Levi
- Melchizedek
- Moses
- New Covenant
- Related Bible parts: Exodus 25, Jeremiah 31

== Bibliography ==
- Attridge, Harold W. (2007). "75. Hebrews". In Barton, John; Muddiman, John (eds.). The Oxford Bible Commentary (first (paperback) ed.). Oxford University Press. pp. 1236–1254. ISBN 978-0199277186.
- deSilva, David A. (2005). "Hebrews". In Evans, Craig A. (ed.). Bible Knowledge Background Commentary: John's Gospel, Hebrews-Revelation. The Bible Knowledge Series (illustrated ed.). Colorado Springs, Colo.: Victor. pp. 199–256. ISBN 9780781442282.
