= Jeremiah 33 =

Book of Jeremiah, chapter 33

- ← chapter 32 chapter 34 →
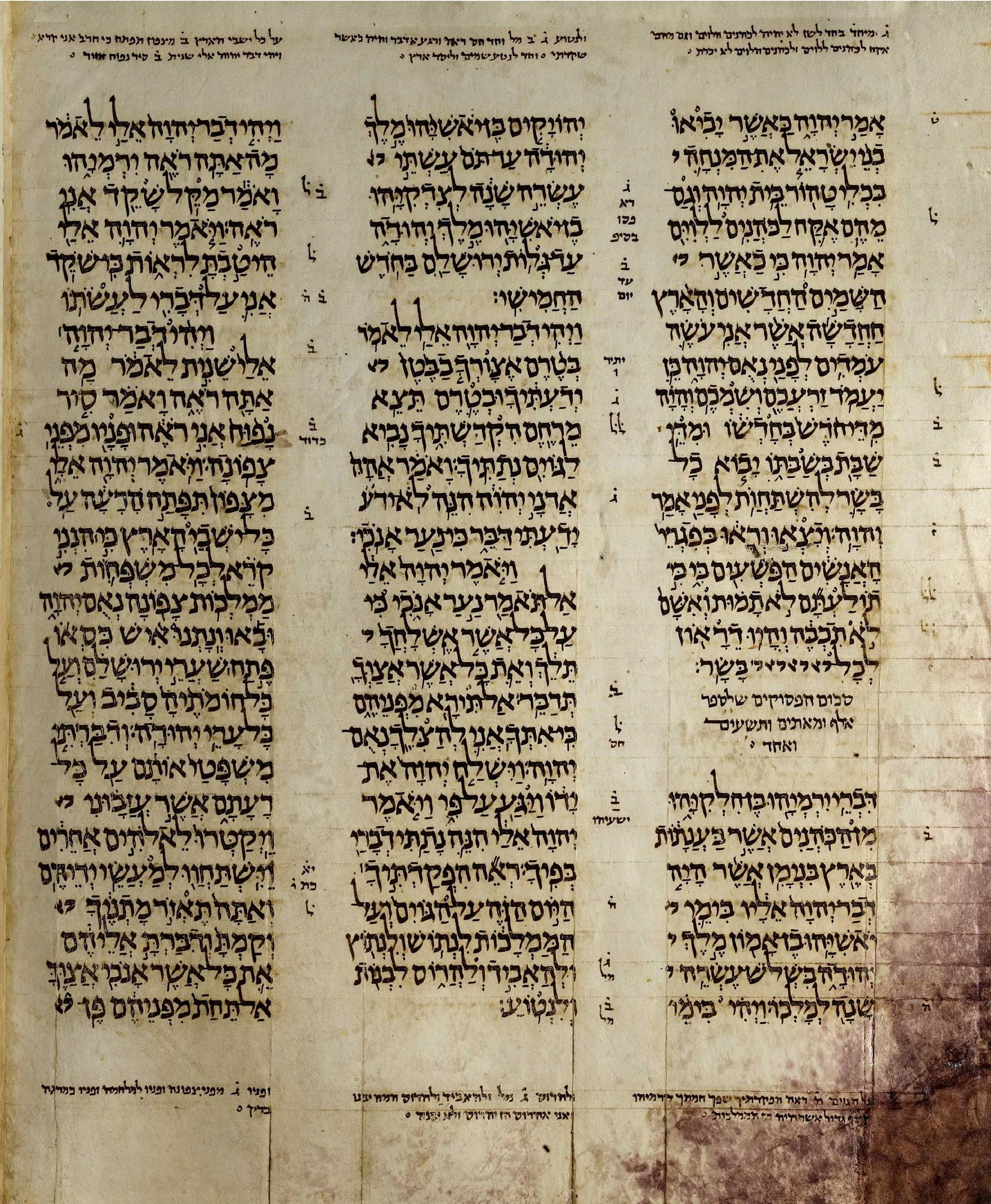
- A high resolution scan of the Aleppo Codex showing the Book of Jeremiah (the sixth book in Nevi'im).
- Book: Book of Jeremiah
- Hebrew Bible part: Nevi'im
- Order in the Hebrew part: 6
- Category: Latter Prophets
- Christian Bible part: Old Testament
- Order in the Christian part: 24

Jeremiah 33 is the thirty-third chapter of the Book of Jeremiah in the Hebrew Bible or the Old Testament of the Christian Bible. It is numbered as Jeremiah 40 in the Septuagint. This book contains prophecies attributed to the prophet Jeremiah, and is one of the Books of the Prophets.

== Text ==
The original text of this chapter, as with the rest of the Book of Jeremiah, was written in Hebrew language. Since the division of the Bible into chapters and verses in the late medieval period, this chapter is divided into 26 verses.

=== Textual witnesses ===
Some early manuscripts containing the text of this chapter in Hebrew are of the Masoretic Text tradition, which includes the Codex Cairensis (895), the Petersburg Codex of the Prophets (916), Aleppo Codex (10th century), Codex Leningradensis (1008). Some fragments containing parts of this chapter were found among the Dead Sea Scrolls, i.e., 4QJer^{c} (4Q72; 1st century BC), with extant verses 16-20 (similar to Masoretic Text), and 4Q252 with the extant verse 17.

There is also a translation into Koine Greek known as the Septuagint (with a different chapter and verse numbering), made in the last few centuries BCE. Extant ancient manuscripts of the Septuagint version include Codex Vaticanus (B; $\mathfrak{G}$^{B}; 4th century), Codex Sinaiticus (S; BHK: $\mathfrak{G}$^{S}; 4th century), Codex Alexandrinus (A; $\mathfrak{G}$^{A}; 5th century) and Codex Marchalianus (Q; $\mathfrak{G}$^{Q}; 6th century). The Septuagint version doesn't contain a part what is generally known to be verses 14–26 in Christian Bibles.

=== Verse numbering ===
The order of chapters and verses of the Book of Jeremiah in the English Bibles, Masoretic Text (Hebrew), and Vulgate (Latin), in some places differs from that in Septuagint (LXX, the Greek Bible used in the Eastern Orthodox Church and others) according to Rahlfs or Brenton. The following table is taken with minor adjustments from Brenton's Septuagint, page 971.

The order of Computer Assisted Tools for Septuagint/Scriptural Study (CATSS) based on Alfred Rahlfs' Septuaginta (1935), differs in some details from Joseph Ziegler's critical edition (1957) in Göttingen LXX. Swete's Introduction mostly agrees with Rahlfs' edition (=CATSS).

Hebrew, Vulgate, English	Rahlfs' LXX (CATSS)
33:1-13	40:1-13
33:14-26	none
26:1-24	33:1-24

== Parashot ==
The parashah sections listed here are based on the Aleppo Codex. Jeremiah 33 is a part of the "Twelfth prophecy (Jeremiah 32-33)" in the "Consolations (Jeremiah 30-33)" section of Prophecies interwoven with narratives about the prophet's life (Jeremiah 26-45). {P}: open parashah; {S}: closed parashah.

{P} 33:1-3 {P} 33:4-9 {S} 33:10-11 {S} 33:12-13 {S} 33:14-16 {S} 33:17-18 {P} 33:19-22 {S} 33:23-24 {S} 33:25-26 {P}

== Structure ==
The New King James Version divides this chapter into the following sections:

- Jeremiah 33:1–18 = Excellence of the Restored Nation
- Jeremiah 33:19–26 = The Permanence of God's Covenant

== Cross references ==
- Jeremiah 33:4: Isaiah 22:10
- Jeremiah 33:5: 2 Kings 23:14
- Jeremiah 33:16: Jeremiah 23:5, 6

== The LORD promises peace (33:1–13) ==
=== Verse 1 ===
Moreover the word of the Lord came to Jeremiah a second time, while he was still shut up in the court of the prison, saying

The year was 588 BCE.

=== Verse 2 ===
Thus says the Lord who made it, the Lord who formed it to establish it (the Lord is His name):

The Revised Standard Version and other translations explain 'it' as 'the earth', following the Septuagint. Reformation theologian John Calvin argued that 'it' refers to Jerusalem as this verse acts as a preface to verses 4 and 5.

The Latin Vulgate's text has the future tense:

Haec dicit Dominus, qui facturus est, et formaturus illud, et paraturus: Dominus nomen ejus:

English translation:

Thus saith the Lord, who will do, and will form it, and prepare it, the Lord is his name.

=== Verse 3 ===
[The Lord said:] ‘Call to Me, and I will answer you, and show you great and mighty things, which you do not know.’

- "Mighty": translated from the Hebrew passive participle or adjective which is normally used to describe cities or walls as "fortified" or "inaccessible"; used here metaphorically as "secret" or “mysterious” things, that Jeremiah could not know apart from the Lord’s revelation.

== The LORD'S eternal covenant with David (33:14–26) ==
=== Verse 15 ===
In those days and at that time
I will cause to grow up to David
A Branch of righteousness;
He shall execute judgment and righteousness in the earth.

- "Branch": translated from (Hebrew: צֶ֫מַח, tsemakh); cf. Isaiah 4:2; Isaiah 11:1; Jeremiah 23:5; Isaiah 53:2; Zechariah 3:8; Zechariah 6:12
- "Branch of righteousness": refers to "a messianic king of Davidic lineage who would rule according to the divine ideal."

=== Verse 16 ===
In those days Judah will be saved,
And Jerusalem will dwell safely.
And this is the name by which she will be called:

THE LORD OUR RIGHTEOUSNESS.

- "THE LORD OUR RIGHTEOUSNESS" (Hebrew: יהוה צדקנו, Yah-weh tsiḏ-qê-nū): the new name of Jerusalem (Isaiah 1:26) is the king's name in Jeremiah 23:6.

=== Verse 24 ===
"Have you not noticed that these people are saying, ‘The Lord has rejected the two kingdoms he chose’? So they despise my people and no longer regard them as a nation."

The "two kingdoms" or families (Septuagint: δύο συγγενείας, duo suggeneias) are generally thought to be Israel the northern kingdom, and Judah the southern kingdom, although in Ronald Knox's translation he suggests that the reference is "probably [to] the tribes of Juda and Benjamin", rather than to Israel and Judah or to Levi and David or Jacob and David, the other possible combinations of families which he considered possible based on the surrounding text.

== See also ==
- Abraham
- Benjamin
- Chaldea
- David
- Isaac
- Israel
- Jacob
- Jeremiah
- Jerusalem
- Levi
- Related Bible part: Isaiah 4, Isaiah 11, Isaiah 22, Isaiah 53, Jeremiah 23, Zechariah 3, Zechariah 6

== Sources ==
- Coogan, Michael David (2007). Coogan, Michael David; Brettler, Marc Zvi; Newsom, Carol Ann; Perkins, Pheme (eds.). The New Oxford Annotated Bible with the Apocryphal/Deuterocanonical Books: New Revised Standard Version, Issue 48 (Augmented 3rd ed.). Oxford University Press. ISBN 9780195288810.
- Fitzmyer, Joseph A. (2008). A Guide to the Dead Sea Scrolls and Related Literature. Grand Rapids, MI: William B. Eerdmans Publishing Company. ISBN 9780802862419.
- Ulrich, Eugene, ed. (2010). The Biblical Qumran Scrolls: Transcriptions and Textual Variants. Brill. ISBN 9789004181830.
- Würthwein, Ernst (1995). The Text of the Old Testament. Translated by Rhodes, Erroll F. Grand Rapids, MI: Wm. B. Eerdmans. ISBN 978-0-8028-0788-5.
