= Garev =

Hill outside Jerusalem mentioned by Jeremiah

Coordinates: 31.777468°N 35.234946°E

Gareb or Garev is a place name and a personal name appearing in the Hebrew Bible.

== Jeremiah's "hill of Gareb" ==
The hill of Gareb, Hebrew Giv'at Garev or Gibeat Gareb, and usually translated as hill of lepers or Leper's Hill, is the name of a height from the Jerusalem area, only mentioned once in the Hebrew Bible, in the Book of Jeremiah 31:38. The biblical passage is not easy to interpret, with varying opinions about the hill's exact location, but it seems that it was outside Jerusalem's city walls in the times of Jeremiah, i.e. until the destruction of Jerusalem in 586 or 587 BCE, but at least in part within the city walls after the reconstruction under Nehemiah. Israeli archaeologist Gabriel Barkay, echoing earlier interpretations, sees Gareb and Goah, the two names occurring together in Jeremiah's prophecy, as the northern, as of 586 still unwalled suburbs of the city, while some 19th-century authors like Keil and Delitzsch are placing it northwest of the city's northwest corner, strongly arguing against other contemporaries who identified it with the hill of Bezetha, the hill north of the Temple Mount.

According to the prophecy of Jeremiah, the city of Jerusalem would one day stretch as far as "the hill of Garev".

== Gareb, David's soldier ==
A warrior named Gareb (Garev) from the tribe of Judah is mentioned in 2 Samuel 23 and the First Book of Chronicles (2 Samuel 23:38; 1 Chronicles 11:40). Two among King David's guard of thirty, Ira and Gareb, are both qualified there as "the Ithrite". They may have come from Jattir (Yatir), in the mountains of Judah.
