= Christine Hayes =

American academic and professor (born 1960)

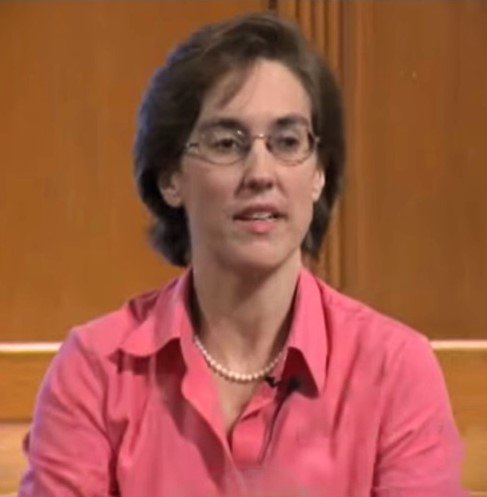
- Hayes in 2006
- Born: December 6, 1960 (age 65)
- Spouse: Michael Della Rocca

Academic background
- Education: Harvard University (BA); University of California, Berkeley (MA, PhD)
- Thesis: Between the Babylonian and Palestinian Talmuds: Accounting for Halakhic difference in selected Sugyot from tractate Avodah Zarah (1993)
- Doctoral advisor: Daniel Boyarin

Academic work
- Discipline: Jewish studies
- Institutions: Yale University
- Website: Yale Faculty Page

Christine Hayes (born December 6, 1960) is an American academic and scholar of Jewish studies, who served as the Sterling Professor of Religious Studies in Classical Judaica at Yale University until her retirement in 2023, specializing in Talmudic and Midrashic studies and Classical Judaica.

== Early life and education ==
Hayes was born to Australian parents living in the United States. According to Hayes, the family moved frequently in her early years. When Hayes was 11 years old her parents decided to return home to Australia, moving the family first to Sydney and then to Adelaide where Hayes completed her secondary education.

She credits her parents' interest in philosophy, religion, literature, and world culture as instrumental in shaping her own intellectual passions, including her eventual study of Jewish history, culture, and religion. Though her work has primarily dealt with historical Jewish texts, Hayes is not Jewish.

Upon finishing high school, Hayes returned to the United States to study at Harvard University and received her B.A. summa cum laude in the Study of Religion in 1984. There, Hayes relates that she stumbled into the Harvard University Hillel and began to teach herself to read Hebrew.

She interrupted her undergraduate studies in 1982 and worked as a volunteer on an Israeli Kibbutz. After two years of working in the non-profit sector, Hayes returned to academia in 1986, pursuing a doctorate in Classical (biblical and rabbinic) Judaism through the Department of Near Eastern Studies at UC Berkeley. She spent the 1987–88 academic year as an exchange student at the Hebrew University in Jerusalem.

Hayes earned an M.A. in 1988, and a PhD in 1993. Her PhD dissertation, "Between the Babylonian and Palestinian Talmuds: Accounting for Halakhic difference in selected Sugyot from tractate Avodah Zarah" sought to compare and account for halakhic differences between the two Talmuds.

== Career ==
In 1993, Hayes was appointed assistant professor of Hebrew studies in the department of Near Eastern languages and civilizations at Princeton University. In 1996, she became an assistant professor in the department of religious studies at Yale University where she gained tenure in 2002.

Hayes was awarded a New Directions Fellowship from the Andrew W. Mellon Foundation in 2003 that enabled her to pursue studies in legal history and legal theory.

In 2006, Hayes' Introduction to Hebrew Bible course was selected by Yale as a pilot for the university's Open Courses online platform allowing anyone around the world to access course materials and recordings of the lectures.

In addition to publishing numerous books and publications, Hayes has also dedicated time to institutions supporting Jewish Studies research and scholarship. Hayes has been a visiting professor at the Tel Aviv University Faculty of Law (2015), a visiting professor at the University of Pennsylvania Law School (2018), and a fellow at the Katz Center for Advanced Judaic Studies (2018). Since 2015, she has been a Senior Faculty Fellow at the Shalom Hartman Institute of North America.

From 2012 to 2016, Hayes served as the co-editor of the Association of Jewish Studies Review. In 2017, she was elected president of the Association for Jewish Studies.

In 2021 Hayes was named a Sterling Professor, one of the highest academic honors that Yale University bestows.

== Scholarship ==
Hayes' scholarship addresses a wide range of historical, literary, legal, and philosophical topics in biblical and rabbinic literature.

Her second book, Gentile Impurities and Jewish Identities: Intermarriage and Conversion from the Bible to the Talmud, is a work of cultural history. It examines the diverse ways in which biblical, Second Temple, and rabbinic sources employ purity language to construct Jewish identity and to inscribe and police community boundaries with varying degrees of porousness.

Her most recent book, What's Divine about Divine Law? Early Perspectives, traces two radically distinct conceptions of divine law—Greco-Roman natural law grounded in reason and biblical law grounded in divine will—that emerged in antiquity and confronted one another in the Hellenistic period.

== Personal life ==
In 1988, Hayes married Michael Della Rocca, a Sterling professor of philosophy at Yale University. They have two sons. Hayes and Della Rocca are the second-ever Sterling Professorship couple in Yale University history.

== Selected publications ==
=== Books ===
- What's Divine about Divine Law?. Princeton University Press. 2015. ISBN 978-1-4008-6641-0. OCLC 1034233639. (Note: Winner of the: 2015 National Jewish Book Award in the category of Scholarship 2016 Jordan Schnitzer Award from the Association for Jewish Studies 2016 PROSE award in the category of Theology and Religious Studies, given by the Professional and Scholarly Publishing (PSP) Division of the Association of American Publishers (AAP))
- Introduction to the Bible. New Haven, Conn: Yale University Press, 2012. ISBN 9780300181791
- Gentile Impurities and Jewish Identities: Intermarriage and Conversion from the Bible to the Talmud. Oxford University Press. 2004. ISBN 0-19-515120-8. OCLC 57502065.
- Between the Babylonian and Palestinian Talmuds: Accounting for Halakhic Difference in Selected Sugyot from Tractate Avodah Zarah. Oxford University Press. 1997. ISBN 0-19-509884-6. OCLC 470282018. (Note: Awarded the 1999 Salo Baron Prize for a first book in Jewish Thought and Literature by the American Academy for Jewish Research.)
