= List of biblical names starting with A =

This page includes a list of biblical proper names that start with A in English transcription, both toponyms and personal names. Some of the names are given with a proposed etymological meaning. For further information on the names included on the list, the reader may consult the sources listed below in the References and External links. For links to more specific lists (places, personal names, women, OT, NT, animals and plants, etc.), go to List of biblical names: See also.

A – B – C – D – E – F – G – H – I – J – K – L – M – N – O – P – Q – R – S – T – U – V – Y – Z

== A ==
- Aaron, a teacher or lofty, bright, shining (etymology doubtful)
- Abba, father
- Abaddon, see Apollyon a destroyer,
- Abagtha, God-given "etymology doubtful"
- Abana, perennial, stony
- Abarim, regions beyond
- Abda, a servant
- Abdeel, servant of God
- Abdi, my servant
- Abdiel, servant of God
- Abdon, servile
- Abednego, servant of Nego, perhaps the same as Nebo
- Abel, breath, vapor, transitoriness; breath, or vanity
- Abel-beth-maachah, meadow of the house of Maachah, "also called ABEL-MAIM"
- Abel-cheramim
- Abel-maim
- Abel-meholah, meadow of dancing, or the dancing-meadow
- Abel-mizraim, the meadow of the Egyptians
- Abel-shittim, meadow of the acacias
- Abez, lofty
- Abi
- Abiyyah
- Abi-albon, father of strength, i.e. "valiant"; "also called ABIEL"
- Abiasaph, father of gathering, i.e. gathered father of gathering; the gatherer
- Abiathar, father of abundance, i.e. liberal, father of abundance, or my father excels
- Abib, an ear of corn, green fruits
- Abida (or Abidah)
- Abidan, father of the judge
- Abiel, father (i.e., "possessor") of God = "pious"
- Abiezer (or Abieezer), father of help, helpful
- Abigail, father, i.e. source, of joy
- Abihail, father of, i.e. possessing, strength
- Abihu, he (God) is my father, father of Him; i.e., "worshipper of God"
- Abihud, father of renown, famous, father (i.e., "possessor") of renown
- Abijah, father (i.e., "possessor or worshipper") of Yahweh
- Abijam, father of the sea; i.e., "seaman", Abijah or Abijam: my father is Yahweh
- Abilene, land of meadows
- Abimael, father of Mael, God is a father
- Abimelech, father of the king; "my father a king, or, father of a king"
- Abinadab, father of nobleness; i.e., "noble"
- Abinoam, "Father of Kindness"
- Abiram, father of height; i.e., "proud"
- Abishag, "father of wandering"
- Abishai, father of (i.e., "desirous of") a gift
- Abishalom, "father of peace"
- Abishua, father of welfare; i.e., "fortunate"
- Abishur, father of the wall father of the wall, i.e. "mason"
- Abital, father of the dew father of the dew, i.e. "fresh"
- Abitub, father of goodness,
- Abiud, father of praise
- Abner, father of light
- Abram, a high father
- Abraham, father of a multitude
- Absalom, father of peace
- Abubus
- Accad
- Accho
- Aceldama, field of blood
- Achab
- Achaia, trouble
- Achaicus, belonging to Achaia
- Achan, or Achar, troubler
- Achaz
- Achbor, mouse
- Achim
- Achish
- Achmetha
- Achor
- Achsah
- Achshaph
- Achzib, lying, false
- Adadah, festival or boundary, possible miswritten form of Aroer
- Adah, ornament, ornament, beauty
- Adaiyyah
- Adalia
- Adam, red earth
- Adamah, red earth
- Adami, my man; earth
- Adar, high
- Adbeel
- Addi, ornament
- Addin
- Addon, lord
- Adiel
- Adin dainty, delicate
- Adinah
- Adithaim, double ornament
- Adlai
- Admah
- Admatha
- Admin
- Adna
- Adnah
- Adoni-bezek (or Adonibezek)
- Adonijah, my lord is Yahweh
- Adonikam
- Adoniram
- Adoni-zedek
- Adoraim
- Adoram
- Adrammelech, splendor of the king
- Adramyttium
- Adria
- Adriel, God is helper
- Aduel
- Adullam
- Adummim
- Aedias
- Aeneas (or Æneas)
- Aenon (or Ænon)
- Aesora
- Agabus
- Agag
- Agagite
- Agar
- Agee
- Aggaba (variant of Hagabah)
- Agia (Greek variant of Hebrew Hattil)
- Agrippa
- Agur
- Ahab, uncle
- Aharah
- Aharhel
- Ahasbai
- Ahasuerus
- Ahava
- Ahaz, one that takes or possesses
- Ahaziyyah
- Ahi, my brother; my brethren
- Ahiah
- Ahiam
- Ahian
- Ahiezer
- Ahihud
- Ahijah, brother of the Lord
- Ahikam, a brother who raises up
- Ahilud
- Ahimaaz
- Ahiman, brother of the right hand
- Ahimelech, brother of the king
- Ahimoth, brother of death
- Ahinadab
- Ahinoam
- Ahio
- Ahira, brother of evil, i.e. unlucky
- Ahiram
- Ahisamach
- Ahishahar, "the [divine] brother is dawning light"
- Ahishar
- Ahithophel, brother of foolishness
- Ahitub, brother of goodness
- Ahlab
- Ahlai, beseeching; sorrowing; expecting
- Ahoah
- Aholah
- Aholiab
- Aholibah
- Aholibamah, my tabernacle is exalted
- Ahumai, brother of water, i.e. cowardly
- Ahuzam
- Ahuzzath
- Ai, or Hai, heap of ruins
- Aiah
- Aiath
- Aijeleth-Shahar
- Ain, spring, well
- Ajalon
- Akeldama
- Akkad
- Akkub
- Akrabbim
- Alammelech
- Alemeida
- Alian
- Allon, an oak
- Allon-bachuth
- Almodad, measure
- Almon, concealed
- Almon-diblathaim
- Alpheus
- Alush
- Alvah
- Amad
- Amal, labor
- Amalek
- Aman
- Amana
- Amariyyah, the Lord says, i.e. promises
- Amasa
- Amasia
- Amashai
- Ami
- Amaziah, the strength of the Lord
- Aminadab
- Amittai
- Ammah
- Ammi, my people
- Ammiel
- Ammihud, people of praise
- Amminadab
- Ammishaddai
- Ammizabad
- Ammon
- Amnon, faithful
- Amok
- Amon
- Amorite
- Amos, burden
- Amoz, strong; robust
- Amplias, large
- Amram, an exalted people
- Amraphel
- Amzi, strong
- Anab, grape-town
- Anah, one who answers
- Anaharath
- Anaiah, whom Yahweh answers
- Anak
- Anamim
- Anammelech
- Anani
- Ananias
- Anathema
- Anathoth
- Andrew, manly
- Andronicus
- Anem
- Aner
- Aniam
- Anim
- Anna, grace
- Annas, humble
- Antichrist
- Antioch
- Antipas
- Antipatris, for his father
- Antothijah, answers of Yahweh
- Anub
- Apelles
- Apharsathchites, etymology uncertain
- Aphek, strength
- Aphekah
- Aphik
- Aphiah
- Apocalypse, revelation
- Apocrypha, concealed, hidden
- Apollonia
- Apollonius
- Apollos
- Apollyon, a destroyer, angel of the bottomless pit
- Appaim, nostrils
- Apphia
- Aquila, an eagle
- Ar
- Ara
- Arab
- Arabia, barren, desert
- Arad, a wild ass
- Arah, wayfaring
- Aram, high
- Aran, wild goat
- Aranda
- Ararat
- Araunah, ark
- Arba, city of the four
- Archelaus, the prince of the people
- Archippus, master of the horse
- Arcturus
- Ard, one that descending, descent
- Ardon
- Areli
- Areopagus
- Aretas
- Argob
- Ariel, lion of God
- Arimathea
- Arioch
- Aristarchus, the best ruler
- Aristobulus, the best counsellor
- Armageddon, the hill or city of Megiddo
- Arnon
- Aroer
- Arpad
- Arphaxad
- Artaxerxes, the great warrior
- Artemas
- Arumah, height
- Asa, physician; cure
- Asahel, made by God
- Asaiah, the Lord has made
- Asaph, collector of the people
- Asareel
- Asenath, worshipper of Neith
- Ashan, smoke
- Ashbel, old fire
- Ashdod
- Asher, happy, blessed
- Asherah
- Ashima
- Ashkenaz, spreading fire
- Ashnah
- Ashriel
- Ashtaroth
- Ashur, black
- Asia
- Asiel, created by God
- Askelon
- Asnapper
- Asriel,
- Assir, captive
- Asshurim, possibly peasants
- Assos, approaching
- Assur, same as Ashur
- Assyria
- Asuppim, house of gatherings
- Asyncritus, incomparable
- Atad, a thorn
- Atarah, a crown
- Ataroth, crowns
- Ataroth-addar
- Ater, shut up
- Athach
- Athaiah, "meaning obscure"
- Athaliah
- Athlai
- Attai
- Attalia, from Attalus
- Augustus, venerable
- Ava
- Aven
- Avim
- Avith
- Azaliah, "Yahweh has reserved"
- Azaniah, Yahweh listened
- Azariah
- Azaz, strong
- Azazel
- Azaziah
- Azbuk,
- Azekah
- Azel,
- Aziel,
- Azgad, "Gad is strong"
- Aziza,
- Azmaveth
- Azmon
- Aznoth-tabor, ears of Tabor
- Azor
- Azotus
- Azrael
- Azriel, help of God
- Azrikam
- Azubah, forsaken
- Azur
- Azzan
- Azzur, one who helps
