= List of biblical names starting with J =

This page includes a list of biblical proper names that start with J in English transcription, both toponyms and personal names. Some of the names are given with a proposed etymological meaning. For further information on the names included on the list, the reader may consult the sources listed below in the References and External links. For links to more specific lists (places, personal names, women, OT, NT, animals and plants, etc.), go to List of biblical names: See also.

A – B – C – D – E – F – G – H – I – J – K – L – M – N – O – P – Q – R – S – T – U – V – Y – Z

== J ==
- Jaala, ascending, a little doe or goat; wild goat;
- Jaalam, he will be hid,
- Jaanai, Jehovah answers,
- Jaasau, Jehovah makes,
- Jaasiel, God is maker,
- Jaasu, created;
- Jaazaniah, Jehovah does hear, may God hear'
- Jaaziah, God consoles or determines, may God strengthen,
- Jaaziel, God is determining or consoling, may God strengthen,
- Jabal, a river, moving, or which glides away, stream,
- Jabbok
- Jabesh, a dry place; dry,
- Jabez, he makes sorrow or height; sorrow;
- Jabin, Jabneh, God discerns or intelligent; he understands,
- Jabneel
- Jachan, afflicting or troublous; affliction,
- Jachin he does establish or founding; established;
- Jacob, he that supplants or follows after; supplanted;
- Jada, wise
- Jadau, favorite or friend
- Jadon, he that rules or abids,
- Jaddua, very knowing,
- Jael, Ibex - Judges 4:17
- Jagur
- Jah
- Jahath, revival or grasping;
- Jahaz
- Jahaziah, Jehovah reveals; Jehovah sees;
- Jahaziel, God sees or reveals,
- Jahdai, guide or he directs,
- Jahdiel, union of God or God makes glad;
- Jahdo, union;
- Jahleel, God waits or God does grievously afflict;
- Jahmai, Jehovah protects;
- Jahzeel, God apportions or distributes;
- Jahzerah
- Jair, Jehovah enlightens, arouses or who diffuses light;
- Jairus, He will enlighten or diffuse light;
- Jakan
- Jakeh, pious or hearkening;
- Jakim
- Jaakobah
- Jalon
- Jambres
- James, English form of the Hebrew name Yakov, ie. Jacob.
- Jamin
- Jamlech
- Janna
- Janoah, rest
- Janum
- Japheth
- Japhia,
- Japhlet
- Japho
- Jarah
- Jareb
- Jared
- Jaresiah
- Jarib
- Jarmuth
- Jasher
- Jashobeam
- Jashub
- Jasiel
- Jason
- Jathniel
- Jattir
- Javan
- Jazer
- Jaziz
- Jearim
- Jeaterai
- Jeberechiah
- Jebus
- Jebusi
- Jecamiah
- Jecoliah
- Jeconiah,
- Jed
- Jedaiah
- Jediael
- Jedidah
- Jedidiah
- Jeduthun
- Jeezer
- Jegar-sahadutha
- Jehaleleel
- Jehdeiah
- Jehezekel
- Jehiah
- Jehizkiah
- Jehoadah
- Jehoaddan
- Jehoahaz
- Jehoash
- Jehohanan
- Jehoiachin
- Jehoiada
- Jehoiakim
- Jehoiarib
- Jehonadab
- Jehonathan
- Jehoram
- Jehoshaphat
- Jehosheba
- Jehoshua
- Jehovah to be, exist, I am who am, hath sent me; I am who am with you,
  - The traditional and most consistant translation of YHWH, though an inaccurate vowelisation.
- Jehovah-jireh
- Jehovah-nissi
- Jehovah-shalom
- Jehovah-shammah
- Jehovah-tsidkenu
- Jehozabad
- Jehozadak
- Jehu
- Jehubbah
- Jehucal
- Jehud
- Jehudijah
- Jehush
- Jekabzeel
- Jekameam
- Jekamiah
- Jekuthiel
- Jemima
- Jemuel
- Jephthah
- Jephunneh
- Jerah
- Jerahmeel
- Jered
- Jeremai
- Jeremiah
- Jeremoth
- Jeriah
- Jericho
- Jeriel
- Jerijah
- Jerimoth
- Jerioth
- Jeroboam
- Jeroham
- Jerubbaal
- Jerubbesheth
- Jeruel
- Jerusalem
- Jerusha
- Jesaiah
- Jeshebeab
- Jesher
- Jeshimon in Judah
- Jeshishai
- Jeshohaia
- Jeshua
- Jeshurun
- Jesiah
- Jesimiel
- Jesse
- Jesui
- Jesus, being interpreted by Christians as the Christ, in Greek Iesous being pronounced Jesus saviour
- Jesus (name), from the Greek version of Jehoshua, transliterated from "Yehoshua," meaning "Jehovah is salvation."
- Jether
- Jetheth
- Jethlah
- Jethro
- Jetur
- Jeuel
- Jeush
- Jew
- Jezaniah
- Jezebel
- Jezer
- Jeziah
- Jezoar
- Jezrahiah
- Jezreel
- Jibsam
- Jidlaph
- Jimnah
- Jiphtah
- Jiphtah-el
- Joab
- Joachim
- Joah
- Joahaz
- Joanna
- Joash
- Joatham
- Job
- Jobab
- Jochebed
- Joed
- Joel
- Joelah
- Joezer
- Jogbehah
- Jogli
- Joha
- Johanan, Jehovah is or has been gracious
- John
- Joiarib
- Jokdeam
- Jokim
- Jokmeam
- Jokneam
- Jokshan
- Joktan
- Jonadab
- Jonah
- Jonan
- Jonathan, God has given
- Joppa
- Jorah
- Joram
- Jordan, Some translate it as "the descender," from the Semitic yrd, "to descend"
- Jorim
- Josabad
- Josaphat
- Jose
- Joseph, may God add
- Joses
- Joshah
- Joshaviah
- Joshbekashah
- Joshua
- Josiah, God supports and heals
- Josibiah
- Josiphiah
- Jotham
- Jozabad
- Jozachar
- Jubal
- Jucal
- Judah
- Judas
- Judaea
- Judith
- Jude
- Julia
- Julius
- Junia
- Jushab-hesed
- Juttah
