= List of biblical names starting with Z =

This page includes a list of biblical proper names that start with Z in English transcription, both toponyms and personal names. Some of the names are given with a proposed etymological meaning. For further information on the names included on the list, the reader may consult the sources listed below in the References and External links. For links to more specific lists (places, personal names, women, OT, NT, animals and plants, etc.), go to List of biblical names: See also.

A – B – C – D – E – F – G – H – I – J – K – L – M – N – O – P – Q – R – S – T – U – V – Y – Z

== Z ==
- Zaanaim, removings
- Zaanannim
- Zaavan, terror,
- Zabad, gift
- Zabbai, wanderer, pure pure
- Zabbud, given, gift
- Zabdi, Gift of Jehovah, my gift
- Zabdiel, gift of God
- Zaccai, pure
- Zacchaeus, pure; clean; just
- Zaccur, mindful
- Zachariah, remembered by Jehovah, remembered by the Lord
- Zacharias, the Lord has remembered, Greek form of Zechariah,
- Zacher, memento; recollection; commemoration
- Zadok, just righteous
- Zaham, fatness
- Zair, little, small
- Zalaph, wound
- Zalmon, shady,
- Zalmonah, shady,
- Zalmunna
- Zamzummims
- Zanoah, marsh
- Zaphnath-paaneah, revealer of a secret, the man to whom secrets are revealed
- Zarah
- Zareathites
- Zared
- Zarephath
- Zaretan
- Zareth-shahar
- Zarhites
- Zartanah
- Zarthan
- Zatthu
- Zattu
- Zavan
- Zaza
- Zebadiah
- Zebah
- Zebaim
- Zebedee, my gift
- Zebina
- Zeboiim
- Zeboim
- Zebudah
- Zebul
- Zebulonite
- Zebulun, dwelling; habitation
- Zebulunites
- Zechariah
- Zedad
- Zedekiah
- Zeeb
- Zelah
- Zelek
- Zelophehad
- Zelotes
- Zelzah
- Zemaraim
- Zemarite
- Zemira
- Zenan
- Zenas
- Zephaniah
- Zephath
- Zephathah
- Zephi, variant spelling of Zepho. A son of Eliphaz, grandson of Esau and one of the “dukes” of Edom.
- Zepho, variant spelling of Zephi. A son of Eliphaz, grandson of Esau and one of the “dukes” of Edom.
- Zephon
- Zephonites
- Zer
- Zerah
- Zerahiah
- Zered
- Zereda
- Zeredathah
- Zererath
- Zeresh
- Zereth
- Zeri
- Zeror
- Zeruah
- Zerubbabel
- Zeruiah
- Zetham
- Zethan
- Zethar
- Zia
- Ziba
- Zibeon
- Zibia
- Zibiah
- Zichri
- Ziddim
- Zidkijah
- Zidon
- Zidonians
- Zif
- Ziha
- Ziklag
- Zillah
- Zilpah
- Zilthai
- Zimmah
- Zimran
- Zimri
- Zin
- Zina
- Zion
- Ziph
- Ziphah
- Ziphims
- Ziphion
- Ziphites
- Ziphron
- Zippor
- Zipporah
- Zithri
- Ziz
- Ziza
- Zizah
- Zoan
- Zoar
- Zoba
- Zobah
- Zobebah
- Zohar
- Zoheleth
- Zoheth
- Zophah
- Zophai
- Zophar
- Zophim
- Zorah
- Zorathites
- Zoreah
- Zorites
- Zorobabel
- Zuar
- Zuph
- Zur
- Zuriel
- Zurishaddai
- Zuzim
