= List of biblical names starting with I =

This page includes a list of biblical proper names that start with I in English transcription, both toponyms and personal names. Some of the names are given with a proposed etymological meaning. For further information on the names included on the list, the reader may consult the sources listed below in the References and External links. For links to more specific lists (places, personal names, women, OT, NT, animals and plants, etc.), go to List of biblical names: See also.

A – B – C – D – E – F – G – H – I – J – K – L – M – N – O – P – Q – R – S – T – U – V – Y – Z

== I ==
- Ibhar, he will choose; chooser; God does choose
- Ibleam
- Ibneiah God builds Jehovah does build;
- Ibnijah, whom Jehovah will build up; God builds; Jehovah is builder
- Ibri Hebrew passing over of a Hebrew;
- Ibsam, fragrant
- Ibzan, father of a target; father of coldness splendid, active
- Ichabod, inglorious the glory is not; where is the glory; inglorious
- Iconium
- Idalah
- Idbash, honey-sweet corpulent;
- Iddo God's friend affectionate; festal; his power;
- Idumea
- Igal, may God redeem deliverer; he will vindicate;
- Igeal
- Igdaliah, may God be glorified great is Jehovah
- Iim
- Ije-abarim
- Ijon, look
- Ikkesh, stubborn perverse; subtle
- Ilai, exaltedsupreme
- Illyricum
- Imlah, full God does fill; fulfilling; plenitude
- Imla, whom God will fill up replenisher
- Immanuel God is with is Hebrew c. 8th century
- Immer, saying; speaking; a lamb talkative; prominent
- Imna, God does restrain; withdrawing
- Imnah, may God defend prosperity; he allots
- Imrah, a rebel stubborn; height of Jehovah
- Imri, speaking; exalting; bitter; a lamb projecting; eloquent
- India
- Iphdeiah, may God redeem Jehovah does deliver; redemption
- Ir, watcher
- Ira, watcher; watchful; city watch
- Irad, wild ass; heap of empire; dragon fleet
- Iram watchful
- Iri, Jehovah is watcher
- Irijah, may God see God does see; provide; fear of the Lord
- Irpeel
- Ir-shemesh
- Iru, watch
- Isaac, he laughed laughing one
- Isaiah, God's salvation Jehovah is helper; salvation is of the Lord
- Iscah, who looks
- Iscariot, a man of murder; a hireling man of kerioth
- Ishbah, praising He praises, appeaser
- Ishbak, free, empty, exhausted
- Ishbi-benob, man sitting in Nob dweller on the mount, he that predicts
- Ishbosheth, a man of shame
- Ishi, saving my help, saving
- Ishiah, Jehovah exists, forgiveth
- Ishma, distinction, elevated
- Ishmael, God that hears hears
- Ishmaiah, may God hear Jehovah hears
- Ishmerai, God guards God keeps
- Ishod, famed man of honor, man of splendor
- Ishpan, firm, strong
- Ishtob
- Ishuah, Isuah, equal, self-satisfied
- Ishui, Jesui, equality
- Ishvah, resembles
- Ishvi, quiet
- Ismaiah, Jehovah hears
- Ispah
- Israel, he strives with God, ruling with God
- Issachar, rewarded
- Isshiah, there is God
- Isshijah, there is God
- Isui
- Ithai, God is with me
- Italy
- Ithamar, island of the palm-tree palm-coast, palm tree
- Ithiel, God is with me God is, God is with me
- Ithmah, purity, bereavement
- Ithra, excellent
- Ithran
- Ithream, populous remnant, abundance of the people
- Ittah-kazin
- Ittai, with me plowman, living
- Iturea
- Ivah
- Iye Abarim
- Izehar
- Izhar, Izehar, oil bright one, olive oil
- Izrahiah, may God shine forth Jehovah is appearing, does arise
- Izri, creative, former
- Izziah, Jeziah, Jehovah exalts
