= List of biblical names starting with B =

This page includes a list of biblical proper names that start with B in English transcription, both toponyms and personal names. Some of the names are given with a proposed etymological meaning. For further information on the names included on the list, the reader may consult the sources listed below in the References and External links. For links to more specific lists (places, personal names, women, OT, NT, animals and plants, etc.), go to List of biblical names: See also.

A – B – C – D – E – F – G – H – I – J – K – L – M – N – O – P – Q – R – S – T – U – V – Y – Z

== B ==
- Baal, "owner" or "lord", also "husband" (as possessor of the wife); possessor, controller
- Baalah
- Baalath
- Baalath-Beer
- Baal-berith
- Baal-gad
- Baal-hamon
- Baal-hanan, the Lord is gracious
- Baal-hermon
- Baali
- Baalim
- Baalis, lord of joy, rules
- Baal-meon
- Baal-peor
- Baal-perazim
- Baal-shalisha
- Baal-tamar
- Baal-zebub
- Baal-zephon
- Baana, affliction
- Baanah, son of grief
- Baara
- Baaseiah, Jehovah is bold
- Baasha, boldness, offensive, he who lays waste
- Babel, confusion; mixture gate of God
- Babylon, Gate Of The Deity, anointment or consecration or confusion or mixing
- Baca
- Bahurim
- Bajith
- Bakbakkar, diligent searcher
- Bakbuk, a flagon, hollow
- Bakbukiah, wasted by Jehovah, effusion of Jehovah
- Balaam, a pilgrim, devouring, lord of the people
- Baladan
- Balak
- Bamah
- Barabbas
- Barachel, father of Elihu
- Barachel of Ammon
- Barachias
- Barak
- Barjesus, wise
- Barjona
- Barnabas
- Barsabas
- Bartholomew
- Bartimeus
- Baruch
- Barzillai
- Bashan
- Bashemath
- Bathsheba
- Bathsuha
- Bealiah
- Bealoth
- Bebai
- Becher
- Bechorath
- Bedad
- Bedaiah
- Bedan
- Beeliada
- Beelzebub
- Beer
- Beera
- Beerelim
- Beeri
- Beer-lahai-roi
- Beeroth
- Beersheba
- Behemoth
- Bekah
- Belah
- Belial
- Belshazzar
- Belteshazzar
- Ben
- Benaiah
- Ben-ammi
- Beneberak
- Bene-jaakan
- Benhadad
- Benhail
- Benhanan
- Benjamin, son of the right hand;
- Benimi
- Beno
- Benoni
- Benzoheth
- Beon, meaning uncertain
- Beor
- Bera
- Berachah
- Berachiah
- Beraiah
- Berea
- Bered
- Beri, meaning "my son" or "my corn"
- Beriah
- Berith
- Bernice
- Berodach-baladan
- Berothai
- Berothath
- Besai
- Besodeiah
- Besor
- Betah
- Beten
- Bethuel
- Betonim
- Beulah
- Bezai,
- Bezaleel
- Bezek
- Bezer
- Bichri
- Bidkar
- Bigthan
- Bigvai
- Bildad
- Bileam
- Bilgah
- Bilhah
- Bilshan
- Binea
- Binnui
- Birsha,
- Bishlam
- Bithiah
- Bithron
- Bithynia
- Bizjothjas
- Blastus
- Boanerges
- Boaz
- Bocheru
- Bochim
- Bohan, thumb or big toe
- Boskath
- Boson
- Bozrah
- Bukki
- Bukkiah
- Bul
- Bunah
- Bunni
- Buz
- Buzi
