= List of biblical names starting with H =

This page includes a list of biblical proper names that start with H in English transcription, both toponyms and personal names. Some of the names are given with a proposed etymological meaning. For further information on the names included on the list, the reader may consult the sources listed below in the References and External links. For links to more specific lists (places, personal names, women, OT, NT, animals and plants, etc.), go to List of biblical names: See also.

A – B – C – D – E – F – G – H – I – J – K – L – M – N – O – P – Q – R – S – T – U – V – Y – Z

== H ==
- Haahashtari
- Habaiah
- Habakkuk
- Habazziniah
- Habor
- Hachaliah
- Hachilah
- Hachmoni
- Hadad
- Hadadezer
- Hadadrimmon
- Hadar
- Hadarezer
- Hadashah
- Hadassah
- Hadattah, new, NEW HAZOR
- Hades, see Hell (the grave or place of the dead), “brought down to hell” (hades), i.e., simply to the lowest debasement, descent of Christ into Hell, the death and burial of Jesus, The abode of departed spirits
- Hadlai
- Hadoram
- Hadrach
- Hagab
- Hagabah, grasshopper
- Hagar
- Haggai
- Haggeri
- Haggiah
- Haggith
- Hai, same as Ai = heap of ruins
- Hakkatan
- Hakkoz
- Hakupha
- Halah
- Halak
- Halhul
- Hali (biblical place)
- Hallelujah
- Hallohesh
- Ham
- Haman
- Hamath
- Hamath-zobah
- Hammedatha
- Hammelech
- Hammoleketh, the queen
- Hammon (biblical place)
- Hamonah
- Hamon-gog
- Hamor
- Hamul
- Hamutal
- Hanameel
- Hanan
- Hananeel
- Hanani
- Hananiah
- Hanes
- Haniel
- Hannah
- Hannathon
- Hanniel
- Hanoch
- Hanun
- Hapharaim
- Hara
- Haradah
- Haran
- Harbonah
- Hareph
- Harhaiah
- Harhur
- Harhas
- Harim
- Harnepher
- Harod
- Harosheth
- Harran
- Harsha
- Harum (biblical figure)
- Harumaph
- Haruphite
- Haruz
- Hasadiah
- Hashabiah
- Hashabnah
- Hashem
- Hashub
- Hashubah
- Hashum
- Hashupha
- Hasrah
- Hatach
- Hathath
- Hatita
- Hattill
- Hattush
- Hauran
- Havilah
- Havoth-Jair
- Hazael
- Hazaiah
- Hazar-addar
- Hazar-enan
- Hazar-gaddah
- Hazar-hatticon
- Hazarmaveth
- Hazar-shual
- Hazar-susah, or -susim
- Hazeroth
- Hazzelelponi
- Hazezon-tamar
- Hazo
- Hazor
- Heber
- Hebrews
- Hebron
- Hegai, or Hege
- Helam
- Helbah, Helbon
- Heldai, Heleb, Heled
- Helek
- Helem
- Heleph
- Helez
- Heli
- Helkai
- Helkath-hazzurim
- Helon
- Heman
- Hen
- Hena, "he has driven away"
- Henadad
- Henoch
- Hepher
- Hephzibah
- Heres
- Heresh
- Hermas
- Hermogenes
- Hermon
- Herod
- Herodion
- Heshbon
- Heshmon
- Heth
- Hethlon
- Hezekiah
- Hezir
- Hezrai
- Hezron
- Hiddai
- Hiel
- Hierapolis
- Hilen
- Hilkiah
- Hillel
- Hinnom
- Hirah
- Hiram
- Hittite
- Hivites
- Hizkijah
- Hobab
- Hobah
- Hod (biblical figure)
- Hodaiah
- Hodaviah
- Hodesh
- Hoglah
- Hoham
- Holon
- Homam
- Hophni
- Hophra
- Hor
- Horeb
- Horem
- Hor-hagidgad
- Hori
- Horims
- Hormah
- Horonaim
- Horinites
- Hosah
- Hosanna
- Hosea
- Hoshaiah
- Hoshama
- Hotham
- Hothir
- Hukkok
- Hul
- Huldah
- Hupham
- Huppim
- Hur
- Huram
- Huri
- Hushah
- Hushai
- Hushathite
- Huz
- Huzoth
- Huzzab
- Hymeneus
