= List of biblical names starting with N =

This page includes a list of biblical proper names that start with N in English transcription, both toponyms and personal names. Some of the names are given with a proposed etymological meaning. For further information on the names included on the list, the reader may consult the sources listed below in the References and External links. For links to more specific lists (places, personal names, women, OT, NT, animals and plants, etc.), go to List of biblical names: See also.

A – B – C – D – E – F – G – H – I – J – K – L – M – N - O – P – Q – R – S – T – U – V – Y – Z

== N ==
- Naam
- Naaman, pleasantness
- Naamah
- Naarah
- Naaran, juvenile, boyish, juvenile
- Naashon
- Naasson, enchanter
- Nabal
- Naboth
- Nachon
- Nachor
- Nadab
- Nagge
- Nahaliel
- Nahallal
- Naham
- Naharai
- Nahash
- Nahath
- Nahbi
- Nahor
- Nahshon
- Nahum
- Nain
- Naioth
- Naomi, pleasant, gentle
- Naphish
- Naphtali
- Narcissus
- Nathan
- Nathanael
- Nathan-melech
- Naum
- Nazareth
- Nazarite
- Neah
- Neapolis
- Neariah
- Nebai
- Nebaioth
- Neballat
- Nebat
- Nebo
- Nebuchadnezzar
- Nebuzaradan
- Necho
- Nedabiah
- Nehelamite
- Nehemiah
- Nehum
- Nehushta
- Nehushtan
- Neiel
- Nekoda
- Nemuel
- Nepheg
- Nephilim
- Nephish
- Nephishesim
- Nephthalim
- Nephtoah
- Nephusim
- Ner
- Nereus
- Nergal
- Nergal-sharezer
- Neri
- Neriah
- Nethaneel
- Nethaniah
- Nethinim
- Neziah
- Nezib
- Nibhaz, the barker
- Nibshan
- Nicanor
- Nicodemus
- Nicolas
- Nicolaitanes
- Nicopolis
- Niger
- Nimrah
- Nimrod
- Nimshi
- Nineveh
- Nisan
- Nisroch
- No
- Noadiah
- Noah
- Noam, pleasant
- Nob
- Nobah
- Nod
- Nodab
- Noe
- Nogah
- Noha
- Non
- Noph
- Nophah
- Norah
- Nun
- Nymphas
