= List of biblical names starting with D =

This page includes a list of biblical proper names that start with D in English transcription, both toponyms and personal names. Some of the names are given with a proposed etymological meaning. For further information on the names included on the list, the reader may consult the sources listed below in the References and External links. For links to more specific lists (places, personal names, women, OT, NT, animals and plants, etc.), go to List of biblical names: See also.

A – B – C – D – E – F – G – H – I – J – K – L – M – N – O – P – Q – R – S – T – U – V – Y – Z

== D ==
- Dabareh
- Dabbasheth
- Daberath
- Dalaiah, variant spelling of Delaiah
- Dalmanutha
- Dalmatia
- Dalphon
- Damaris
- Damascus
- Damien
- Danaja
- Dan
- Daniel, God is my judge
- Dannah
- Dara, misspelling of Darda
- Darda, a pearl of wisdom
- Darius, he that informs himself of a king
- Darkon, bearer or scattering possibly related to Aramaic terms for hasten or shield
- Dathan, belonging to law
- David, beloved
- Debir, speaker
- Deborah, bee
- Decapolis
- Dedan, low, their friendship
- Dedanim
- Dekar, lance bearer, perforation
- Delaiah, Jehovah is deliverer
- Delilah, Samson's mistress languishing
- Demas, ruler of people
- Demetrius
- Derbe
- Deuel
- Deuteronomy
- Diana
- Diblaim
- Diblah
- Diblath
- Dibon
- Dibon-gad
- Dibri
- Didymus
- Diklah
- Dilean,
- Dimon
- Dimonah
- Dinah
- Dinhabah
- Dionysius
- Diotrephes
- Dishan
- Dishon
- Dizahab
- Dodai,
- Dodavah
- Dodo
- Doeg
- Dophkah
- Dor
- Dorcas
- Dothan
- Drusilla
- Dumah
- Dura
