= Mizzan =

Mizzan is an Italian surname. Notable people with the surname include:

- Ezio Mizzan (1905–1969), Italian diplomat
- Ilda Mizzan (1885–1922), Italian irredentist

== See also ==
- Mizzah
- Mizzau
