= List of biblical names starting with Q =

This page includes a list of biblical proper names that start with Q in English transcription, both toponyms and personal names. Some of the names are given with a proposed etymological meaning. For further information on the names included on the list, the reader may consult the sources listed below in the References and External links. For links to more specific lists (places, personal names, women, OT, NT, animals and plants, etc.), go to List of biblical names: See also.

A – B – C – D – E – F – G – H – I – J – K – L – M – N – O – P – Q – R – S – T – U – V – Y – Z

== Q ==
- Quartus
- Queen of Sheba
- Quirinius

== Bibliography ==
- Comay, Joan, Who's Who in the Old Testament, Oxford University Press, 1971, ISBN 0-19-521029-8
- Lockyer, Herbert, All the men of the Bible, Zondervan Publishing House (Grand Rapids, Michigan), 1958
- Lockyer, Herbert, All the women of the Bible, Zondervan Publishing 1988, ISBN 0-310-28151-2
- Lockyer, Herbert, All the Divine Names and Titles in the Bible, Zondervan Publishing 1988, ISBN 0-310-28041-9
- Tischler, Nancy M., All things in the Bible: an encyclopedia of the biblical world , Greenwood Publishing, Westport, Conn. : 2006 ISBN 0-313-33082-4
