= Ahinadab =

Hebrew Bible character

Ahinadab (Hebrew: אחינדב Ahinadav, "my brother is noble" or "my brother has devoted himself"), son of Iddo, is one of the twelve commissariat officers appointed by Solomon to districts of his kingdom to raise supplies by monthly rotation for his household. He was appointed to the district of Mahanaim (1 Kings 4:14), east of Jordan.

== See also ==
- List of biblical names starting with A
- List of minor Old Testament figures, A–K
