= Zophah =

Zophah is one of the descendants of Issachar, one of the sons of the Patriarch Jacob, as found in First Chronicles 7:35-36, in the Hebrew Bible:

And the sons of his brother Helem; Zophah, and Imna, and Shelesh, and Amal.
The sons of Zophah; Suah, and Harnepher, and Shual, and Beri, and Imrah.

A wiki list of Biblical names says it means "viol; honeycomb". While the patriarchs of ancient Israel did not have viols, but this is the word King James' translators used.
