= Ithiel =

Name mentioned in the Hebrew Bible

Ithiel (Hebrew: אִיתִיאֵל, romanized: ’Iṯi’ēl) is an enigmatic name mentioned in the Hebrew Bible in Proverbs 30:1, "The words of Agur son of Jakeh, [man of] Massa; The speech of the man to Ithiel, to Ithiel and Ucal[.]"

== Origin ==
The name is angelic in origin, having the Hebrew suffix -iel, yodh, aleph, lamedh, and has several meanings.

== Etymology ==
The name, Ithiel, has as its root a variation of the word ʼoṯ (אוֹתּ) "letter, sign" and can be rendered as "the words of God," "he who understood the signs," or "he who understood the alphabet of God."

== Description ==
The Irish abbot and missionary Columba mentions Ithiel, along with Uriel, as one of seven angels charged with taking care of a monastery in his ode "Farewell".

Arthur Cleveland Coxe, in his book Advent: a Mystery, treats Ithiel as an angel in conversation with the counterpart Adiel and writes their dialogue in the form of a play.

Charles Morgridge has described the angel Ithiel as "prince of the seventh or lowest order of the hierarchy of heaven" and of being the weight of judgment for the men of God.

== In gematria ==
In gematria, or Jewish isopsephy, Ithiel equals 452, which has an exact correspondence to the Greek words meizonos (μειζονος) and krithēte (κριθητε), which, when placed together mean “great judge.”

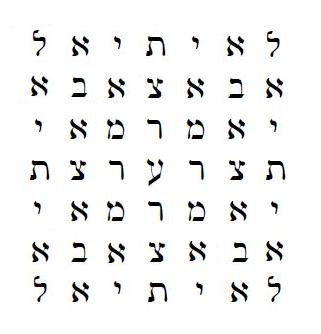
The magic square of Ithiel is a Hebrew amulet that contains a series of barbarous names that can be used in magical evocation.

Occultist Arimanius Théletos, who created the magic square of Ithiel, has used it to derive an evocation of Ithiel that can be used in magic ritual. The words of the evocation are Hebrew renderings of phrases drawn from the Magic Square of Ithiel. It begins with the palindrome “le-Ithiel” (לאיתיאל), meaning "to Ithiel", which can be read along each side of the magic square. Other phrases such as Abba "father" and yomar "he will say" are also encoded within the cryptic message of the cipher. Each other palindrome inside the magic square form barbarous names, corrupted names of deities particularly used in magical evocations. According to Rosemary Ellen Guiley, barbarous names are used "to command all spirits of the firmament, ether, and the elements." Due to the nature of the magic square, each phrase can be read in four different directions.
