= Palal =

Son of Uzai

Palal was a son of Uzai (Neh. 3:25). Palal helped Nehemiah repair the wall of Jerusalem after the Babylonian captivity.

Palal is also another way of saying Pal. As in Palalal.
