= Geba =

Geba may mean:

- Geba River, a river in Guinea, Senegal, and Guinea-Bissau
- Geba, Guinea-Bissau, a village on the above river in Guinea-Bissau
- Geba River (Ethiopia), a tributary of the Tekezé River
- Geba (city), a city in ancient Israel
- Geva Carmel, modern moshav in Israel, ancient Geba
- Geba, Republic of Dagestan, a rural locality in Dagestan, Russia
- Geba Station, a railway station in Tagajō, Miyagi Prefecture, Japan
- Geba syllabary, the system for writing the Naxi language
- Genomic Encyclopedia of Bacteria and Archaea, a project to sequence bacterial genomes and to establish their phylogenetic relationships
- Gimnasia y Esgrima de Buenos Aires (GEBA), a sports club in Buenos Aires, Argentina
