= Mizzau =

Mizzau is an Italian surname. Notable people with the surname include:

- Alfeo Mizzau (1926–2008), Italian politician
- Alice Mizzau (born 1993), Italian swimmer
- Marina Mizzau (born 1937), Italian writer and essayist

== See also ==
- Mizzan
