= Azubah =

Azubah, עזובה, meaning "deserted", is the name of two women in the Bible:

- Azubah (wife of Caleb), the wife of Caleb
- Azubah (mother of Jehoshaphat), daughter of Shilhi, and mother of Jehoshaphat, King of Judah

== See also ==
- Azabache
- Azubu
- Azuben
- Azzaba (disambiguation)
