= Shubael =

Shubael is a given name. People with the given name include:

- Shubael Dimock (c. 1753–1834), Canadian politician from Nova Scotia
- Shubael Dummer (1636–1692), American minister from Massachusetts
- Francis Shubael Smith (1819–1887), American publisher from New York
- Shubael F. White (1841–1914), American politician and judge from Michigan

== See also ==
- Shebuel, figure from the Hebrew Bible
- Shubael Baxter House, house in Massachusetts
- Shubael Pond, pond in Massachusetts, U.S.
