= Telem =

Telem can be any of the following:

- In the Hebrew Bible:
  - a porter of the temple in the time of Ezra (10:24).
  - a town in the southern border of Judah (Josh. 15:24); probably the same as Telaim.
- Telem (1981 political party), a former political party in modern Israel
- Telem, Har Hebron, a Jewish communal settlement in the West Bank
- Benjamin Telem, Israeli Major General and Commander of the Navy
- Telem (2019 political party), an active Israeli political party
