= Zacher =

Zacher is a German surname. Notable people with the surname include:

- Daniel Zacher (born 1988), German footballer
- Elmer Zacher (1880–1944), American baseball player
- Gábor Zacher (born 1960), Hungarian physician
- Gerd Zacher (1929–2014), German composer, organist and writer
- Hans F. Zacher (1928–2015), German academician
- Heidi Zacher, German freestyle skier
- Johann Michael Zächer (1649–1712), Austrian composer
- Julius Zacher (1816–1887), German philologist
- Rolf Zacher (1941–2018), German actor
