= Bealoth =

Biblical city

Bealoth is mentioned in the Old Testament as a city in the extreme southern region of Judah.

- In Joshua 15:24 it is listed as one of the cities of the children of Judah.
- In 1 Kings 4:16 it is noted as the location of Baanah son of Hushai, in this instance it is written as "in Aloth", but in the revised version is read as Bealoth.

As a Bible name Bealoth means "citizen" or "cast under".
