= Shubael Pond =

Lake of the United States of America

- Location within Massachusetts
- Location: Willimantic Road; Barnstable, Massachusetts
- Coordinates: 41°40′18″N 70°23′36″W
- Type: Kettle pond
- Basin countries: United States
- Surface area: 56 acres (23 ha)
- Max. depth: 40 feet (12 m)
- Shore length^{1}: 1.1 miles (1.8 km)
- Surface elevation: 43 feet (13 m)
- ^{1} Shore length is not a well-defined measure.

Shubael Pond is a 56-acre (230,000 m^{2}) kettle pond in Barnstable, Massachusetts.

There is a concrete launching ramp for canoes or shallow draft boats and a small parking area which can be accessed via Willimantic Road.

Shubael Pond is stocked twice a year with several varieties of trout.
