= Sallai =

Sallai is both a given name and a surname. Notable people with the name include:

== Given name ==
- Sallai Meridor (born 1955), Israeli politician

== Surname ==
- Balázs Sallai (born 1979), Hungarian footballer
- Roland Sallai (born 1997), Hungarian footballer
- Sándor Sallai (born 1960), Hungarian footballer, uncle of Roland
