= Azel =

Azel, proper name, may refer to:

- Azel: Panzer Dragoon RPG, a 1998 video game
- A descendant of Saul (I Chronicles 8:37; I Chronicles 9:43-44) Books of Chronicles
- A variant spelling of Azal, a place name referred to in Zechariah 14:5 Book of Zechariah
- One of the Four Devas, the Primary Antagonists of God Hand

AzEl or Az-El may also refer to:

- A type of Antenna Rotator mounting (diminutive for Azimuth/Elevation)
- Azel (album)
