= Mizpar =

Mizpar (also Mispar, Mispereth) was a Jewish exile in Babylon who accompanied Zerubbabel back to Jerusalem / Judah.

- References: Ezra 2:1-2; Nehemiah 7:7
- Meaning: number
