= Raham =

Raham was a biblical character mentioned in the genealogical lists of 1 Chronicles, in 1 Chronicles 2:44. He was a descendant of Caleb and Hezron, a son of Shema, and the father of Jorkeam.
