= Gob =

Gob or GOB may refer to:

== Music ==
- Gob (band), a Canadian punk band, or their self-titled album
- Gob (Dels album), 2011

== People ==
- Art Gob (born 1937), American football player
- Nicolas Gob (born 1982), Belgian actor
- Garland Buckeye (1897–1975), nicknamed Gob, American baseball and football player

== Fictional characters ==
- Gob Bluth, a fictional character on the TV show Arrested Development
- Gob, a Magical Monster from the game My Singing Monsters

== Other uses ==
- Gob, a place in Palestine where the Israelites clashed in battles with the Philistines (2 Samuel 21:18–19)
- GObject Builder, an object preprocessor for GObject/C
- GOB, station code of Gobowen railway station, England
- Government of Bangladesh
- Government of Barbados
- Government of Belize
- Grand Orient of Belgium, a Belgian cupola of masonic lodges
- Robe Airport, in Bale Robe, Ethiopia
- Whoopie pie, also known as gob, a baked dessert food
- Coal refuse from coal mining
- Gob, British English slang for mouth
