= Zarhites =

Biblical tribe

The Zarhites were a branch of the tribe of Judah descended from Zerah, the son of Judah.
