= Jehoahaz =

Jehoahaz or Joachaz (Hebrew: יְהוֹאָחָז, Modern: Yeho'aẖaz, Tiberian: Yəhôʼāḥāz, "Yahweh has held"; Greek: Ιωαχαζ Iōakhaz; Latin: Joachaz) was the name of several people mentioned in the Hebrew Bible.

- Jehoahaz of Israel (815–801 BC or 814–798 BC), eleventh king of Israel and son of Jehu
- Jehoahaz of Judah (633/632–609 BC), seventeenth king of Judah and son of Josiah (Jehoahaz III of Judah)
- The youngest son of Jehoram, king of Judah (2 Chronicles 21:17; 22:1, 6, 8, 9), more commonly known as Ahaziah (Jehoahaz I of Judah)
- The full name of Ahaz of Judah, by which he is mentioned in the annals of Tiglath-Pileser III (Jehoahaz II of Judah)
