= Assir =

Assir can refer to:

- 'Asir Region, Saudi Arabia
- Assir (biblical figure), a minor figure in the Bible
