= Azaziah =

Azaziah (Biblical Hebrew: עֲזַזְיָהוּ, romanized: ʿăzazyāhû, lit. 'YHWH is strong') may refer to:

- One of the Levitical musicians during the transportation of the Ark of the Covenant (I Chronicles 15:21).
- The father of Hoshea, who was made ruler over the Ephraimites (I Chronicles 27:20).
- A Levite who had charge of the temple offerings in the days of Hezekiah (II Chronicles 31:13).
