= Shedeur =

Shedeur is a given name. Notable people with the name include:

- Shedeur Sanders (born 2002), American football player
- Shedeur, a minor figure in the Hebrew Bible
