= Jahdai =

Jahdai is a biblical figure who according to 1 Chronicles 2:47, was either a concubine or a descendant of Caleb, son of Hezron. The text is ambiguous on the matter. 1 Chronicles 2:46-48 (Young's Literal Translation) reads:

^{46}And Ephah concubine of Caleb bare Haran, and Moza, and Gazez; and Haran begat Gazez.

^{47}And sons of Jahdai: Regem, and Jotham, and Geshem, and Pelet, and Ephah, and Shaaph.

^{48}The concubine of Caleb, Maachah, bare Sheber and Tirhanah

The name has two possible meanings. The first part is יה (yah), a shortened form of יהוה (YHWH), the name of God; the second part may come from a rare verb הדה (hada), meaning to stretch out one's hand (particularly to handle snakes, to snake-charm). Another possible meaning is "whom Jehovah directs".
