= Calneh =

City founded by Nimrod

Calneh (כַלְנֵה) was a city founded by Nimrod, mentioned three times in the Hebrew Bible (Genesis 10:10, Isaiah 10:9, and Amos 6:2). The verse in Genesis reads:

וַתְּהִי רֵאשִׁית מַמְלַכְתֹּו בָּבֶל וְאֶרֶךְ וְאַכַּד וְכַלְנֵה בְּאֶרֶץ שִׁנְעָֽר׃
"And the beginning of his kingdom was Babel, and Erech, and Accad, and Calneh, in the land of Shinar" (KJV)

Historical scholarship proposed candidate locations for the city of "Calneh", but it is now considered most likely, in a suggestion going back to W.F. Albright (1944), that the word did not in origin refer to a city but has been corrupted from an expression meaning "all of them". In the Revised Standard Version, the English translation of the verse reads:

The beginning of his kingdom was Babel, Erech, and Accad, all of them in the land of Shinar.

Calneh ("Chalanne") was identified with Ctesiphon in Jerome's Hebrew questions on Genesis (written ca. 390), following Eusebius of Caesarea. Easton's 1897 Bible Dictionary silently follows Sir Henry Rawlinson in interpreting the Talmudic passage Joma 10a identifying Calneh with the modern Nippur, a lofty mound of earth and rubbish situated in the marshes on the east bank of the Euphrates, but 30 miles distant from its present course, and about 60 miles south-south-east from Babylon.

A second Calneh is mentioned in the Book of Amos, and some have also associated this place with Calno which is mentioned in similar terms in the Book of Isaiah. (Amos 6:2, Isaiah 10:9) This is identified by some archaeological scholars as Kulnia, Kullani or Kullanhu, modern Kullan-Köy, between Carchemish on the Euphrates River and Arpad near Aleppo in Northern Syria, about ten kilometers southeast from Arpad. Canneh, mentioned in the Book of Ezekiel 27:23 as one of the towns with which Tyre carried on trade was associated with Calneh by A.T. Olmstead, History of Assyria. Xenophon mentioned a Kainai on the west bank of the Tigris below the Upper Zab.
