= Othni =

Othni is a name that appears once in the Bible. He is a son of Shemaiah, the first born of Obed-edom, one of the gatekeepers during the reign of David (1 Chronicles 26:7).

Jones' Dictionary of Old Testament Proper Names attributes the name to Arabic "Lion Of The Lord". NOBSE Study Bible Name List says the name is an abbreviated form of Othniel (which means "God Is Force"), which would give Othni the meaning of "Force".
