= Abagtha =

Abagtha (Hebrew: אבגתא, romanized: ’Ǎḇaḡṯā) was a court official (or a eunuch) of King Ahasuerus. He is mentioned once in the Book of Esther (Esther 1:10). According to this narrative, King Ahasuerus commanded Abagtha and six other officials to parade the Queen Vashti before the king and his ministers in the crown jewels. Her refusal led to her demise and the selection of Esther as the new queen of the Persian Empire.

According to Lloyd Llewellyn-Jones, the name Abagtha seems to be the same as ‘Bigtha’ (Old Persian: Bagadāta, ‘god-given’, ‘whose law is divine’, or ‘gif of god’), but with a prefix, and its etymology may be ‘law received from god’. Alternatively, it may derive from the Avestan word gabata, ‘fortunate one’.

In Esther 1:10, Abagtha is referred as a סָרִיס (sarīs). This Hebrew word, translated eunuch, can mean a general court official, not only a castrated man. Since Abagtha and the other six officials are spoken of as attending to the king, not to royal women, it is possible that he was not a eunuch in the technical sense.
