= Senir =

Senir may refer to:

- Senirkent, a district of Isparta Province, Turkey
- Senir, Gündoğmuş, a village in the district of Gündoğmuş, Antalya Province, Turkey
- Senir, Silifke a village in the district of Silifke, Mersin Province, Turkey
- Senirköyü, Şuhut, a village in the district of Şuhut, Afyonkarahisar Province, Turkey
- Snir, a kibbutz in Israel (Snir and Senir are English spelling variations of the same Semitic name)
- Mount Hermon, which is sometimes called Senir in the Hebrew Bible, as a whole or just one of its peaks
