= Amasai =

There were four biblical characters called Amasai (Hebrew: עֲמָשַׂי "burdensome", pronounced [ʕamɔːˈɬaj]).

The name is rarely used in modern Hebrew. Its only known contemporary appearance is in the first name of the poet and translator Amasai Levin. It is used less rarely as a Hebrew family name.

- Amasai the Levite, son of Elkanah, of the ancestry of Samuel (1 Chr. 6:25, 35).
- The leader of a body of men who joined David in the "stronghold," probably of Adullam (1 Chr. 12:18).
- Amasai the priest who was appointed to precede the ark with blowing of trumpets on its removal from the house of Obed-edom (1 Chr. 15:24).
- Amasai, the father of a Levite, one of the two Kohathites who took a prominent part at the instance of Hezekiah in the cleansing of the temple (2 Chr. 29:12).
