= Ahira =

Hebrew Bible character

Ahira (Hebrew: אֲחִירַע ’Ăḥîra‘, meaning Brother of evil or unlucky or my brother is friend) is a Hebrew Bible character. He was a son of Enan and chosen to be chief of the tribe of Naphtali, one of the leaders of the tribes of Israel during The Exodus. (Numbers 1:15; 2:29)
