= Shua =

- Village
- Location within Azerbaijan
- Coordinates: 38°29′N 48°43′E
- Country: Azerbaijan
- Rayon: Astara
- Time zone: UTC+4 (AZT)
  - Summer (DST): UTC+5 (AZT)

Shua is a village in the Astara Rayon of Azerbaijan.
