= Uzai =

Palal's father in the Bible

In the Bible, Uzai was the father of Palal. Palal helped rebuild the walls of Jerusalem. "Palal the son of Uzai repaired over against the Turning, and the tower that standeth out from the upper house of the king, which is by the court of the guard. " Neh 3:25.
