= Nibhaz =

Deity of the Avim

Nibhaz (Hebrew: נִבְחַז Nīḇḥaz) was a deity of the Avim during the time of Shalmaneser I (2 Kings 17:31), who had been imported to Samaria after the fall of that city before Sargon II. Some indications of worship have been found in Syria, between Berytus and Tripolis, in the form of a dog, a contention first found in the Talmud. Others identify Nibhaz with the Persian god Ibnakhaza or even with the Babylonian god Nebo. Those who understand Nibhaz as being related to dogs tie it to the Egyptian deity Anubis. There were several variants of Nibhaz in Greece, none of which give any clue to the identification of this god.
