= Kemuel =

Kemuel (Hebrew: קְמוּאֵל Qəmūʾēl, "God has risen", "raised by God") is a minor Hebrew masculine name.

== Biblical figures ==
Four Kemuels are mentioned in the Bible.

- One is mentioned in Genesis 22:21 as the nephew of Abraham, son of Nahor, brother of Bethuel (father of Rebekah).
- The second Kemuel was ruler of the tribe of Ephraim in Numbers 34:24.
- The third was the father of Hashbiah, ruler of the tribe of Levi or Levite, in the Book of Chronicles 27:17.
- Kemuel is also an alternate name of the angel Camael.

== Other ==
- Kemuel Delgado (born 1998), a Puerto Rican activist
