= Geba, Republic of Dagestan =

Geba Геба Гьеба
- Selo
- Location within Republic of Dagestan Location within Russia
- Coordinates: 42°12′N 47°23′E
- Country: Russia
- Region: Republic of Dagestan
- District: Akushinsky District
- Time zone: UTC+3:00

Geba (Russian: Геба; Dargwa: Гьеба) is a rural locality (a selo) in Akushinsky District, Republic of Dagestan, Russia. The population was 735 as of 2010. There are 8 streets.

== Geography ==
Geba is located 13 km southeast of Akusha (the district's administrative centre) by road, on the Dargolakotta River. Kurkimakhi is the nearest rural locality.
