= Hachaliah =

Hachaliah or Hacaliah (Hebrew: חֲכַלְיָה) was the father of Nehemiah, the author of the Book of Nehemiah, which is a book of the Hebrew Bible, known to Jews as the Tanakh and to Christians as the Old Testament. Hachaliah's name is mentioned at the beginning of the book and in Nehemiah 10:1: the references to Hachaliah distinguish Nehemiah from others with the same name. Little is known about his status: Bowman notes that many attempts have been made to explain the name Hacaliah, "but none is persuasive".

== See also ==
- Hachaliah Bailey
