= Nethaniah =

Nethaniah may refer to

- Nethaniah, one of the musicians appointed by King David for the musical service of the Temple (1 Chronicles 25:2, 12).
- Nethaniah, the father of Ishmael, who assassinated Gedaliah, governor of Judah (2 Kings 25)
- Nethaniah, the son of Shelemiah, the son of Cushi. He is the father of Jehudi (Jeremiah 36)
