= Zaccai =

Zaccai is both a given name and a surname. Notable people with the name include:

- Zaccai Curtis (born 1981), American pianist and composer
- Jonathan Zaccaï (born 1970), Belgian actor, film director, and screenwriter
