= Tetrarch =

Tetrarch, Tetrarchs, or Tetrarchy may refer to:

- Tetrarchy, the four co-emperors of the Roman Empire instituted by the Emperor Diocletian
- Portrait of the Four Tetrarchs - a sculpture of the four co-emperors of the Roman Empire
- Herodian Tetrarchy, formed by the sons of Herod the Great
- Tetrarch, Military rank in ancient Greek armies
- Tetrarch (novel), a 2003 novel by Ian Irvine
- Light Tank Mk VII Tetrarch, a British light tank of World War II
- The Tetrarch, a Thoroughbred racehorse
- The Tetrarchs of Ancient Thessaly under Philip II of Macedon
- The Tetrarchs of Galatia in Asia Minor
- Tetrarches, a rank in the Byzantine army
- Tetrarch, a 1981 fantasy novel by Alex Comfort
- Tetrarch (band), a nu metal band from Atlanta, Georgia
- Tetrarchy, a subdivision of the Royal Phalanx in 19th-century Greece
- HMS Tetrarch is the name of two vessels that have served in the Royal Navy

== See also ==
- Tetricus (disambiguation), 3rd century rulers of the Gallic Empire
- Philip the Tetrarch, the ruler of the northeast part of his father's kingdom
- Herod Antipas, the ruler of Galilee and Perea
- Herod Archelaus, actually titled ethnarch, the ruler of Idumaea, Judea and Samaria
