= Kishi (biblical figure) =

Kishi (also Kushaiah) (Hebrew: קִישִׁי) is a figure in the Old Testament. 1 Chronicles 6:44 states Kishi is a Merarite, and the father of the ancestor of Ethan the minstrel in the time of David.
