= Kadmiel =

Character from Nehemiah

Kadmiel: before God; i.e., his servant, one of the Levites who returned with Zerubbabel from the Babylonian captivity (Nehemiah 9:4, 10:9, 12:8).
