= Abidan =

Biblical figure

Abidan (a-bi'-dan, Hebrew אֲבִידָן), son of Gideoni, was a judge, head of the tribe of Benjamin and one of the leaders of the tribes of Israel at the time of the Exodus. His name means father of judgment or My father (i.e. God) has judged.

Abidan is referred to in Numbers 1:11, Numbers 2:22, Numbers 7:60, Numbers 7:65 and Numbers 10:24.
