= Hukkok =

Hukkok may refer to either of two cities in Israel:

- The ancient village of Huqoq, later known as Yaquq
- The kibbutz of Hukok
