= Tarah =

Tarah is a feminine given name. Notable people with the name include:

- Tarah Donoghue, American secretary
- Tarah Gieger (born 1985), Puerto Rican motocross racer
- Tarah Hogue, Canadian curator and writer
- Tarah Kayne (born 1993), American figure skater
- Tarah Korir (born 1987), Canadian long-distance runner
- Tarah Paige (born 1982), American gymnast and dancer
- Tarah Probst, American politician
- Tarah Lynne Schaeffer (born 1984), American actress
- Tarah Toohil (born 1979), American attorney and politician
- Tarah Wheeler (born 1979), American author
