= Amashsai =

Amashsai (Amashai in the King James Version) was a biblical character. The son of Azareel, he was appointed by Nehemiah to reside at Jerusalem and do the work of the temple. He merits only one mention in the whole Bible, in Nehemiah 11:13.

== See also ==
- Nehemiah
