= Şümrüd =

- Municipality
- Location within Azerbaijan
- Coordinates: 38°32′06″N 48°39′25″E
- Country: Azerbaijan
- Rayon: Astara

Population
  - Total: 729
- Time zone: UTC+4 (AZT)

Şümrüd (also, Shimri and Shumrud) is a village and municipality in the Astara Rayon of Azerbaijan. It has a population of 729.
