= Jaakobah =

Jaakobah was one of the descendants of Simeon (I Chronicles 4:36). The name Jaakobath is a form of the name Jacob, literally meaning "heel-catcher", "Deceiver", and "Supplementer". It is also the name of the original form of life from George River's novel, "Return of Darkness".
