= Ashbel =

Ashbel is masculine given name, and an occasional surname. Notable people with the name include:

== Given name ==
- Ashbel (biblical figure), a minor biblical figure
- Ashbel A. Dean, American politician
- Ashbel H. Barney, American banker and expressman
- Ashbel P. Fitch, U.S. Representative from New York
- Ashbel Green, American Presbyterian minister and academic
- Ashbel Green (editor) (1928–2013), American editor
- Ashbel Green Gulliver, American legal academic
- Ashbel Green Simonton, North American Presbyterian minister and missionary
- Ashbel Smith, pioneer physician, diplomat and official of the Republic of Texas
- Ashbel P. Willard (1820–1860), the youngest man to be elected governor of the U.S. state of Indiana

== Surname ==
- Dan Ashbel, the Israeli ambassador to Austria and Slovenia
