= Azzaba =

Azzaba (Arabic: عزابة) may refer to:

- Azzaba, Algeria, a city in the Azzaba District, Skikda Province, Algeria
- Azzaba, Morocco, a commune in the Sefrou Province of the Fès-Boulemane administrative region of Morocco
