= List of biblical names =

This page deals with biblical proper names, both toponyms and personal names.

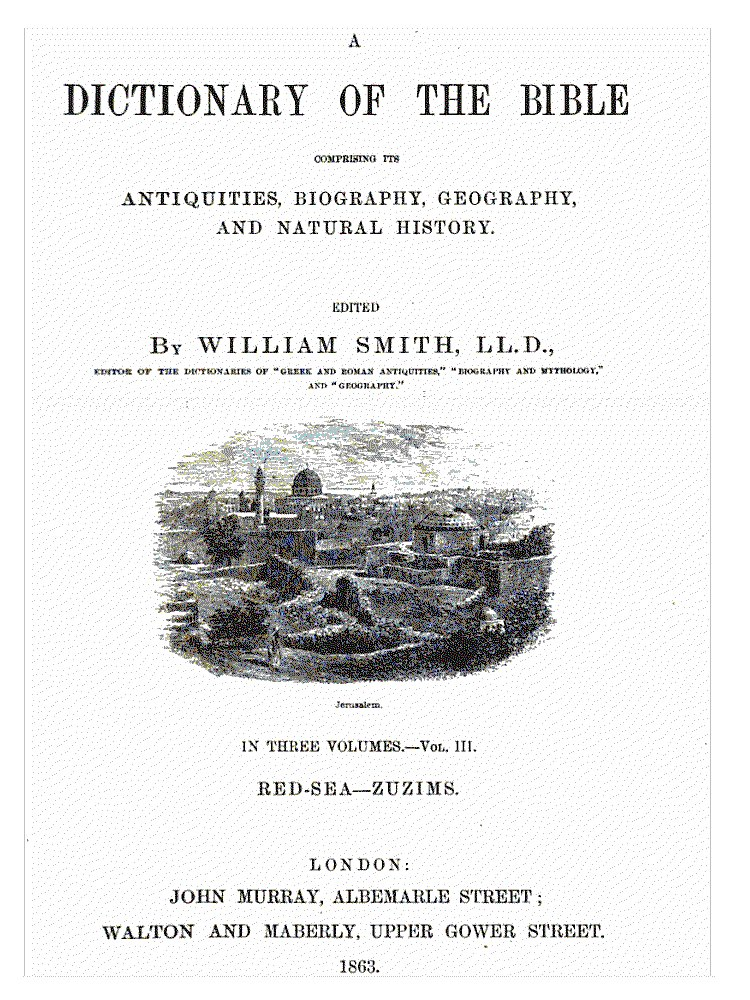
Smith's Bible Dictionary 1863

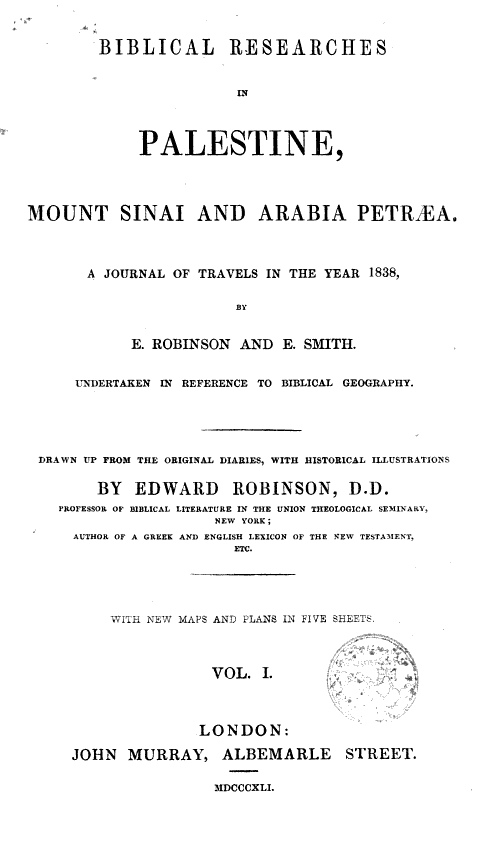
Biblical Researches in Palestine by Edward Robinson, 1841

== Personal names ==
Personal names play a variety of roles in the Bible. They sometimes relate to the nominee's role in a biblical narrative, as in the case of Nabal, a foolish man whose name means "fool". Names in the Bible can represent human hopes, divine revelations, or are used to illustrate prophecies.

The titles given to characters, locations, and entities in the Bible can differ across various English translations. In a study conducted by the BibleAsk team in 2024, a comprehensive catalog of names found in the King James Version was compiled and organized into categories such as individuals, geographical locations, national groups, and miscellaneous designations. The team discovered that within the King James Version Bible, a total of 3,418 distinct names were identified. Among these, 1,940 names pertain to individuals, 1,072 names refer to places, 317 names denote collective entities or nations, and 66 names are allocated to miscellaneous items such as months, rivers, or pagan deities. There are instances of overlap, where the same name may be used across multiple categories (e.g., as both a personal name and a geographical location).

=== Most popular names in ancient Judaea ===
Based on a database of 3000 names documented from written sources dating from 330 BC – AD 200 (from Alexander's conquest through the Hasmonean kingdom and most of the Roman period), the most common twelve male names among Palestinian Jews were:

- 1. Simon/Simeon (243)
- 2. Joseph/Joses (218)
- 3. Lazarus/Eleazar (166)
- 4. Judas/Judah (164)
- 5. John/Yohanan (122)
- 6. Jesus/Joshua (99)
- 7. Ananias/Hananiah (82)
- 8. Jonathan (71)
- 9. Matthew/Matthias/Mattathias (62)
- 10. Manaen/Menahem (42)
- 11. James/Jacob (40)
- 12. Annas/Hanan (35)

During this period, the most common twelve female names were:

- 1. Mary/Mariam (70)
- 2. Salome (58)
- 3. Shelamzion (24)
- 4. Martha (20)
- 5. Joanna (12)
- 5. Sapphira/Shiphra (12)
- 7. Berenice (8)
- 8. Imma (7)
- 8. Mara (7)
- 10. Cyprus (6)
- 10. Sarah (6)
- 10. Alexandra (6)

== Lists of toponyms and personal names ==
Lists of biblical proper names, both toponyms and personal names.

- List of biblical names starting with A
- List of biblical names starting with B
- List of biblical names starting with C
- List of biblical names starting with D
- List of biblical names starting with E
- List of biblical names starting with F
- List of biblical names starting with G
- List of biblical names starting with H
- List of biblical names starting with I
- List of biblical names starting with J
- List of biblical names starting with K
- List of biblical names starting with L
- List of biblical names starting with M
- List of biblical names starting with N
- List of biblical names starting with O
- List of biblical names starting with P
- List of biblical names starting with Q
- List of biblical names starting with R
- List of biblical names starting with S
- List of biblical names starting with T
- List of biblical names starting with U
- List of biblical names starting with V
- List of biblical names starting with Y
- List of biblical names starting with Z

== See also ==
Personal names

- Genealogies in the Bible
- List of major biblical figures
- List of minor Old Testament figures, A–K
- List of minor Old Testament figures, L–Z
- List of minor New Testament figures
- List of women in the Bible
- List of names for the biblical nameless
- Theophoric name

Toponyms

- List of biblical places
- List of modern names for biblical place names
- Onomasticon or On the Place Names in the Holy Scripture by Eusebius, completed in or before 324/325.

Personal names and toponyms etc.

- Young's Analytical Concordance to the Bible – for which later editions contain A complete list of Scripture Proper Names as in the Authorised and Revised Versions, showing their modern pronunciation and the exact form of the original Hebrew by Wm. B. Stevenson.
- Bible names in their native languages

Other

- Gemstones in the Bible
- List of animals in the Bible
- List of plants in the Bible
