= Kareah =

Kareah or Careah (meaning in Hebrew "bald"), according to the Book of Jeremiah, was the father of Johanan and Jonathan, who for a time were loyal to Gedaliah, the Babylonian governor of Jerusalem.
