= Ethni =

In the Hebrew Bible Ethni (Hebrew: אֶתְנִי "my hire") was an ancestor of Asaph, of the Gershonite branch of the Levites. David assigned him to the music ministry of the Lord's house (1 Chronicles 6:41). In 1 Chronicles 6:21, the same person is referred to as "Jeatherai" (KJV spells it "Jeaterai").
