= Shalishah =

Shalishah (Note: In 1 Samuel 9:4, the King James Version spells the name Shalisha.) or Baal-Shalisha (Hebrew: בַּעַל שָׁלִשָׁה) is a place mentioned in the Book of Kings (2 Kings 4:42) and the Talmud (Sanhedrin 12a).

Baal-Shalisha is translated as "lord or master of three things", or "the third idol, the third husband; or, that governs or presides over three" (Baal=lord/master; Shalisha="three things", "third", or "three"). This ancient place name is thought to be preserved in the Arabic name of the modern village of Kafr Thulth. The Greek Septuagint (LXX) calls the same place in 2 Kings 4:32 by the name Beit Sarisa (Greek: Βαιθσαρισα).

According to Eusebius and Jerome, Baal-Shalisha was located 15 (Roman) miles north of Diospolis (Lydda). Eusebius identified it with Baithsarisa, the ancient Biblical village believed to have been located 3.5 miles (5.6 km) to the south of Kafr Thulth at a site known in modern times as Khirbat Sirisya (now Serisiyyah, a ruin located west of Mount Ephraim). Another possibility is Khurbet Kefr Thulth (with Arabic Thulth comparable to the Hebrew Shalisha) which is roughly northeast of there. The Jerusalem Talmud (Sanhedrin 1:2) identifies it as the earliest place each year for fruits to ripen.

== Bibliography ==
- Fleming, William (1838), A gazetteer of the Old and New Testaments: to which is added the natural history of the Bible, Edinburgh Printing and Publishing Company
- Freedman, David Noel; Myers, Allen C.; Beck, Astrid B. (2000), Eerdmans dictionary of the Bible (Illustrated ed.), Wm. B. Eerdmans Publishing, ISBN 978-0-8028-2400-4
- Aid to Bible understanding: containing historical, geographical, religious, and social facts concerning Bible persons, peoples, places, plant and animal life, activities, and so forth. Watchtower Bible and Tract Society of New York. 1969.
