= Mizzah =

Mizzah was a chief/duke of Edom.

Mizzah was the son of Reuel, who was the son of Esau.

- References: Genesis 36:13, 17; I Chronicles 1:37.
- Meanings: "fear," "to faint with fear," or "strong," "firm"
