= Akrabbim =

Coordinates: 30°55′23″N 35°08′01″E

Akrabbim or Acrabbim (Hebrew: עקרבים, meaning "scorpions") is probably the general name given to the ridge containing the pass between the south of the Dead Sea and Zin, es-Sufah, by which there is an ascent to the level of the Negev desert. Scorpions are said to abound in this whole district, and hence the name (Num. 34:4). It is called "Maaleh-acrabbim" in Joshua 15:3, and "the ascent of Akrabbim" in Num. 34:4.

== "Maaleh-acrabbim" in the Book of Judges ==
There is another "Maaleh-acrabbim" mentioned in Judges 1:36, "The Amorite border ran from Maaleh-acrabbim to Sela, and above." This was the border between the Amorites (Philistines) on the coastal plain and the tribe of Dan in the hills southwest of Ephraim.

== Josephus' "Acrabbene" ==
Flavius Josephus, in The Wars of the Jews (ed. William Whiston, A.M.) book 3, section 48, places a toparchy called Acrabbene at the border between Samaria and Judea, as the southernmost part of Samaria: "Now as to the country of Samaria, it lies between Judea and Galilee; it begins at a village that is in the great plain called Ginea, and ends at the Acrabbene toparchy, and is entirely of the same nature with Judea; for both countries are made up of hills and valleys, and are moist enough for agriculture, and are very fruitful."

Ma'ale Akrabim massacre

The Ma'ale Akrabim massacre, known in English as the Scorpions' Pass Massacre, was an attack on an Israeli passenger bus, carried out on 17 March 1954, in the middle of the day. The assailants attacked and entered the bus, shooting eleven passengers to death. One passenger died 32 years later of his injuries, in a state of paralysis and partial consciousness. Four passengers survived, two of whom had been injured by the gunmen.

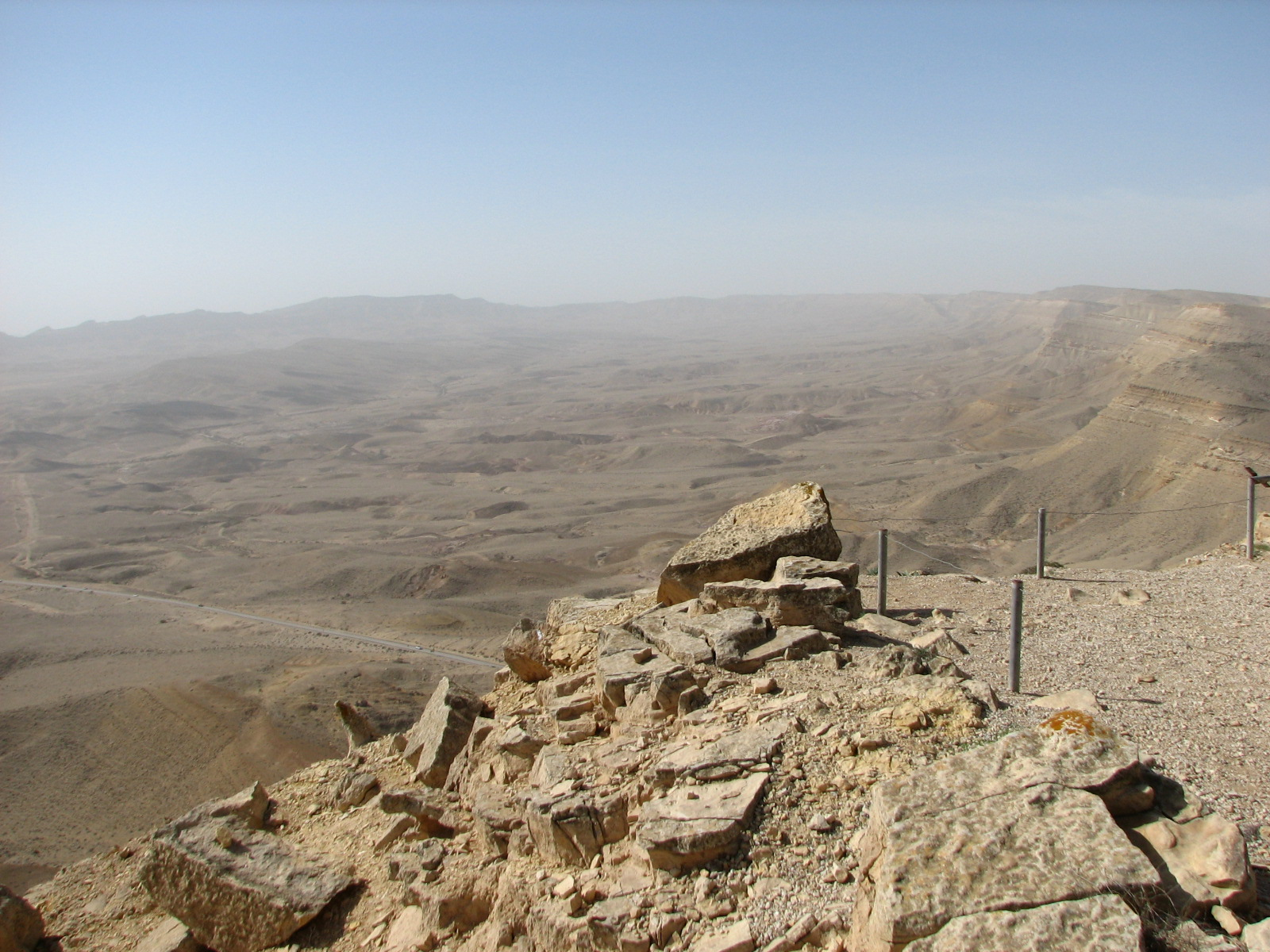
Vista from Ma'ale Akrabim, the site of the massacre.
