= Almon Diblathaim =

Almon Diblathaimah (Hebrew: עַלְמֹן דִּבְלָתָיְמָה) was one of the places the Israelites stopped at during the Exodus. By the name "Almon Diblathaimah" it is referred to only in Numbers 33:46 and 47, in a list of stopping-points during the Exodus. It is usually considered the same place as Beth-diblathaim of Jeremiah 48:22, mentioned in the oracle against Moab.

The suffix-he may be read as a locative, for "Almon toward-Diblathaim," in support of which is the Mesha Stele's ". ובת . דבלתן | ובת . בעלמען, and beth-Diblathan and beth-Baal-M'on" and Jeremiah's mention of "Beth-diblathaim . . . and beth-M'on". Baal M'on (Baalmon in some versions) is orthographically identical to the "in Almon" of MT Num. 33:46, and the Peshitta reads Baal M'on in Numbers 33, which suggests the reading "Baalmon toward-Diblathaim". The Talmud agrees that the final he is a locative suffix: (Note: N.b. that according to y. Megillah 1:9, "Rabbi Simon and Rabbi Samuel b. Nahman would both say, 'The men of Jerusalem would write Jerusalem, Jerusalem-ah, without care. And likewise tzafon (north), tzafon-ah (northward), and teiman (south), teiman-ah (southward)'". R. Nehemiah also reports Jerusalemite practices (b. San. 30a) and may have been a resident. Documentary evidence, including from the Dead Sea Scrolls, confirms that the -ah suffix, while generally a locative in Biblical Hebrew, was sometimes applied to ordinary nominatives in the Second Temple period. See Abraham Geiger, Urschrift p. 233, Saul Lieberman Tarbiz 4(1933) p. 293, Ezekiel Kutscher, Isaiah Scroll, p. 67)

For it was taught: Nehemiah says, "Every word which requires a lamed-prefix [i.e. 'toward'], the Bible [sometimes instead] suffixed a he"; and a teaching of the House of Ishmael, "As in the case of Elim-ah, Mahanaim-ah, Mitzraim-ah, Diblathaim-ah . . ."

The Septuagint, however, does not transcribe a suffix-he: Γελμὼν Δεβλαθαίμ.

== Etymology ==
Etymologically, the name Beit-Diblathaim is said to refer to "The House of Dried Figs", or else "The House of two fig-cakes."
