= Baal-perazim =

Place in ancient Israel

Ba'al-Perazim (Hebrew Owner of Breakings Through) was a place in ancient Israel.

It was the scene of a victory gained by David over the Philistines (2 Samuel 5:20; 1 Chronicles 14:11). It is called Mount Perazim in Isaiah 28:21. It was near the Valley of Rephaim, west of Jerusalem.

Some scholars suggest a site 4 km northwest of Jerusalem, named Sheikh Bodr, to be identical with Ba'al-Perazim.

There is also a valley near Mount Sodom in the Judaean Desert, called "Wadi Perazim".

== Etymology ==
It is not certain whether the occurrence in 2 Sam.5:20 name is:

- (a) a word play - David is punning on an existing local name.
- (b) an anachronism - such as "Abraham came to Dan" Genesis 14:14.

Yoshitaka Kobayashi considers it an anachronism, but the use of Baal rather than El may indicate a play on an existing local name.

If the reference is to Mt. Perazim in Isaiah 28 then that suggests a mountain with a high ground position for David to attack. Alternatively, since David says "Yahweh burst-through" (פָּרַץ יְהוָה) "like bursting of waters" (פֶרֶץ מָיִם) it may be a reference to waters.

== Cultural influences ==
This place name is the origin of term "God of the Breakthrough" in the Gospel music song of that name by Robert Critchley, sung by Lara George.
