= Tappuah =

Tappuah may refer to:

- Tappuah and compounds thereof, place names of biblical sites mentioned in the Book of Joshua
  - Taffuh, Palestinian town in the West Bank 4 miles west of Hebron identified with biblical Beth-Tappuah
- Tappuah, one of the four sons of Hebron

== See also ==
- Kfar Tapuach ('Tapuach Village'), Israeli settlement named after biblical city
