= Kabzeel =

Kabzeel: קַבְצְאֵל (Hebrew)
- Location within Israel
- Coordinates: 31°17′10.284″N 34°55′56.46″E
- Country: Israel
- Region: Due S of Judah, on border of Edom; poss. located ≈ 10 km (6 mi) ENE of Beer-sheba.

Kabzeel (Hebrew: קַבְצְאֵל, romanized: Qavṣəʾel, lit. 'God gathers') is a Hebrew Bible place name. It was the most remote city of Judah; located in southern Judah on the border of Edom (Idumaea) (Joshua 15:21). The location is tentatively identified with Khirbet Hora (Horvat Hur), about 10 km (6 mi) ENE of Beersheba. Kabzeel was the birthplace of Benaiah, one of David's chief warriors (2 Samuel 23:20; 1 Chronicles 11:22). Following the Exile, it was resettled under the name Jekabzeel (Hebrew: יקַּבְצְאֵל, romanized: Yəqqavṣəʾel).

== See also ==
- List of biblical places starting with K
- Benaiah
