= Jesiah =

Jesiah (also Ishiah, Ishijah, Isshiah, Isshijah, Jeshaiah) is a name found in the Bible. The Hebrew form of the name is yishshayah (in one case yishshayahu), meaning "man of Jah." The Bible contains five figures by this name.

- Jesiah son of Izrahiah, son of Uzzi, son of Tola, son of Issachar, found in a genealogy of the Tribe of Issachar.
- Jesiah, a Korahite and member of the Tribe of Benjamin, listed among the warriors who came to David at Ziklag.
- Jesiah, leader of the "sons of Rehabiah," a Levite in the time of David.
- Jesiah, son of Uzziel, son of Kohath, son of Levi. This Jesiah is recorded as being the father of Zechariah.
- Jesiah, one of the "descendants of Harim," found in a list of men who took foreign wives in the time of Nehemiah.
