= Adiel =

Adiel (Hebrew: עדיאל) is a personal name meaning "ornament of God", or possibly "God passes by". It may refer to any of the following:

1. The father of Azmaveth, who was treasurer under David and Solomon, mentioned only in 1 Chronicles 27:25.
2. A family head of the tribe of Simeon, who participated in driving out the Meunim, mentioned only in 1 Chronicles 4:36.
3. A priest mentioned only in 1 Chronicles 9:12, in the genealogy of Maasai.
- Adiel (footballer) (born 1980), Brazilian football midfielder

According to Cheyne and Black, the "Aduel" of Tobit 1:1 has a name which is a Greek variant form of Adiel.
