= Stations of the Exodus =

Locations Israelites visited after Exodus

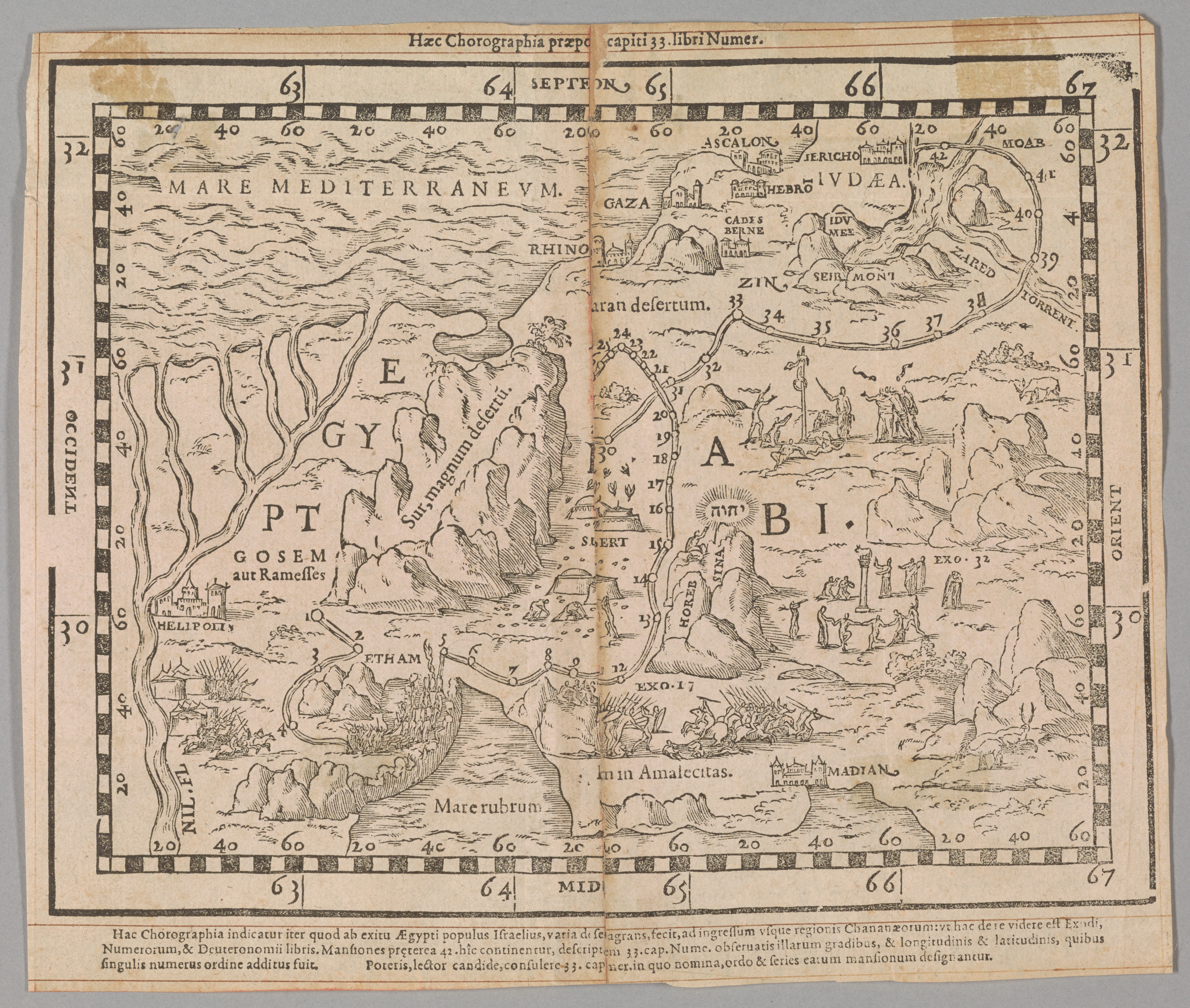
Guillaume Postel, 1555 Hæc chorographia præpocapiti 33. libri numer

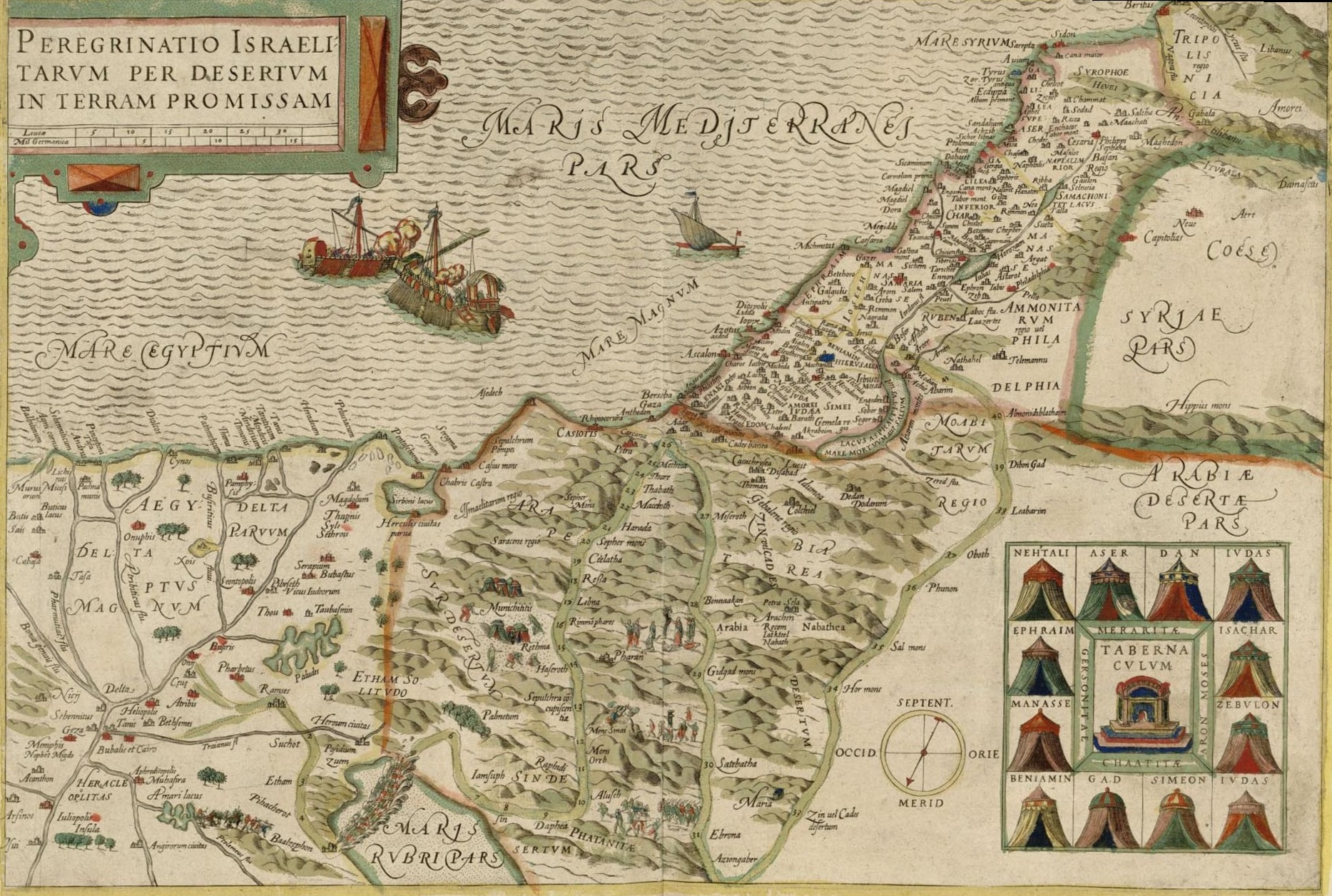
1641 Wanderings in the desert map

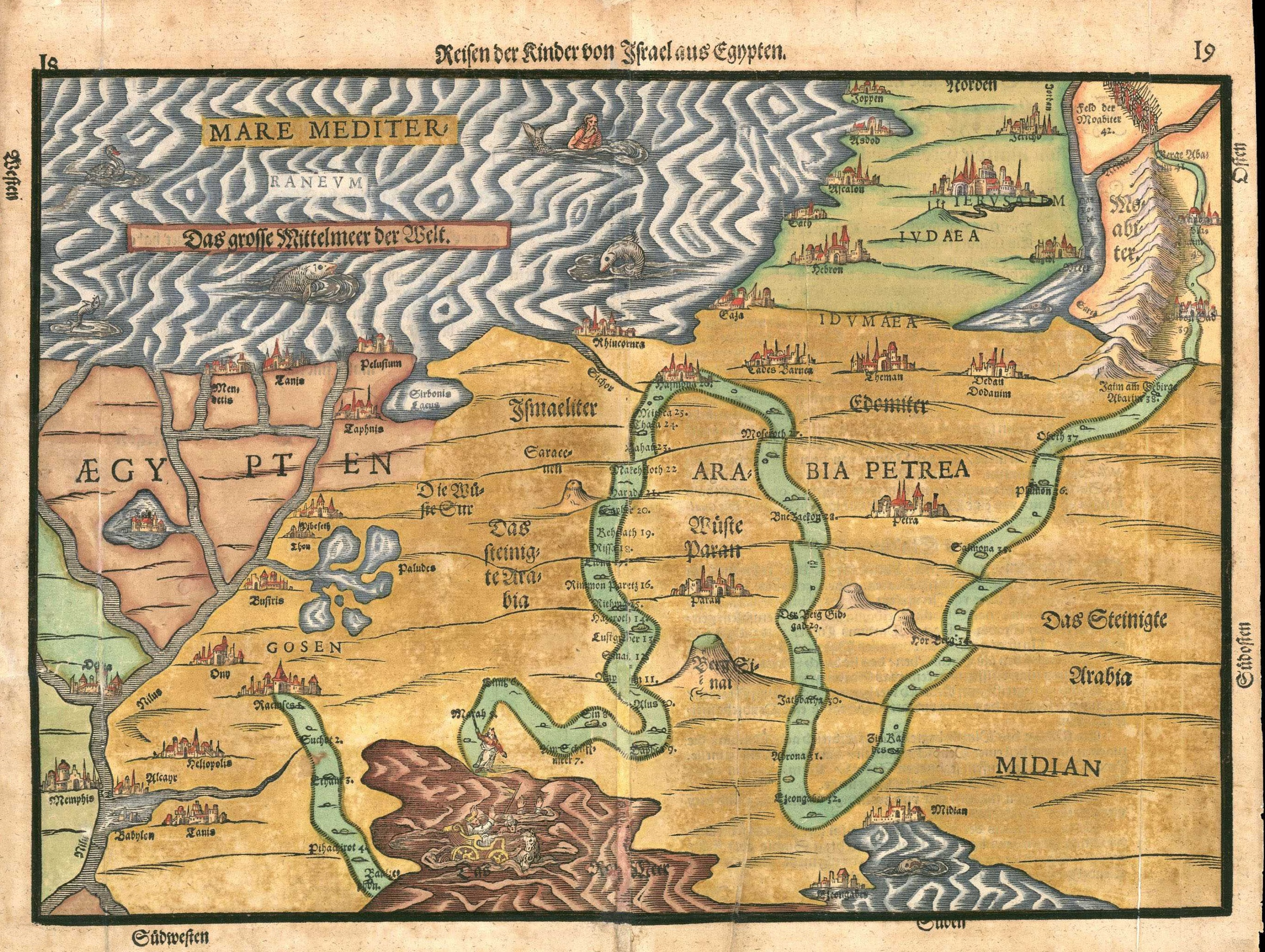
1585 Exodus map

Tilemann Stella's 1557 Itinera Israelitarum ex Aegypto

The Stations of the Exodus are the locations visited by the Israelites following their exodus from Egypt, according to the Hebrew Bible. In the itinerary given in Numbers 33, forty-two stations are listed, although this list differs slightly from the narrative account of the journey found in Exodus and Deuteronomy.

Biblical commentators like St Jerome in his Epistle to Fabiola, Bede (Letter to Acca: "De Mansionibus Filiorum Israhel") and St Peter Damian discussed the Stations according to the Hebrew meanings of their names. Dante modeled the 42 chapters of his Vita Nuova on them.

== Sources ==
According to the documentary hypothesis, the list of the Stations was originally a distinct and separate source text. Proponents of this hypothesis believe that the redactor, in combining the Torah's sources, used parts of the Stations list to fill out awkward joins between the main sources. However, a slightly variant version of the list appears in full at Numbers 33, and several parts of the journey described in the full list (most noticeably the journey from Sinai to Zin) do not appear in the fragmented version.

Both versions of the list contain several brief narrative fragments. For example, Exodus 15:27 reads: "[The Israelites] came to Elim, where there were twelve springs of water and seventy palm trees". It is a matter of some debate as to how much of the narrative is part of the original text of the list, and how much is extra detail added into it by the redactor. Some information may also have been drawn from other sources; Numbers 21 contains both an extract from the lost Book of the Wars of the Lord, and the text of a song about the digging of a well at Beer.

== Locating the Stations ==
Attempting to locate many of the stations of the Israelite Exodus is a difficult task, if not infeasible. Though most scholars concede that the narrative of the Exodus may have a historical basis, the event in question would have borne little resemblance to the mass-emigration and subsequent forty years of desert nomadism described in the biblical account. If a smaller-scale exodus did take place, no trace of it has been found in the archaeological record, so archaeology can give no clues as to the modern-day locations of the stations.

Another factor complicating the issue is that the narrative descriptions of many of the stations lack recognizable distinguishing features, or are very broadly defined. For example, Marah, the fifth station, is described only as a place where the Israelites found the drinking water to be exceptionally bitter. The locations of some stations are given in relative terms, such as the "Wilderness of Sin", which is simply described as the area between Elim and Mount Sinai, which, given the uncertain locations of the numerous stations, cannot be positively determined. Other locations central to the narrative, such as the Sea of Reeds, Mount Sinai, and Raamses, also lack positive identification, making it more difficult to plot a plausible map of the Israelites' journey. As such, proposed identifications of the stations of the Exodus are almost entirely conjectural.

== List of the Stations of the Exodus ==
Station	Biblical reference	Description	Possible location (Note: All proposed locations are speculative, and in many cases there are numerous competing theories. This table includes only those theories which have received wide support from modern scholars.)
Raamses	Ex. 12:37; Nu. 33:3	The Raamses district was of the highest quality land in Egypt (Ge. 47:11)	Pi-Ramesses
Sukkoth	Ex. 12:37, 13:20; Nu. 33:5–6		The region of Wadi Tumilat, or a city within the region, such as Tell el-Maskhuta
Etham	Ex. 13:20; Nu. 33:6–8	"On the edge of the wilderness"	Unknown, but possibly close to modern Ismailia
Pi-HaHiroth	Ex. 14:2; Nu. 33:7–8	"Between Migdol and the sea, opposite Ba'al-Zephon"	Possibly a canal on the eastern frontier of Egypt
Marah	Ex. 15:23; Nu. 33:8–9	A place where the water was too bitter to drink	Bir el-Mura or Ain Hawarah, fifty miles south of Suez
Elim	Ex. 15:27, 16:1; Nu. 33:9–10	"Where there were twelve springs and seventy palm trees"	Wadi Gharandel
By the Red Sea	Nu. 33:10–11		Possibly around the Gulf of Suez
Sin Wilderness	Ex. 16:1, 17:1; Nu. 33:11–12	Between Elim and Mount Sinai; here God supplies quail and manna	
Dophkah	Nu. 33:12–13		Wadi Maghara
Alush	Nu. 33:13–14		Wadi ‘Esh
Rephidim	Ex. 17:1, 19:2; Nu. 33:14–15	Moses brings forth water from the Rock of Horeb; the Israelites battle the Amalekites	Wadi Refayid
Sinai Wilderness	Ex. 19:1–2; Nu. 10:12, 33:15–16	Near Mount Sinai	Possibly the region around Jebel Musa
Kibroth-Hattaavah	Nu. 11:35, 33:16–17		Rueis el-Ebeirig
Hazeroth	Nu. 11:35, 12:16, 33:17–18	Miriam is afflicted with a skin disease	'Ain el-Khudra
Rithmah	Nu. 33:18–19		Wadi el-Rutmi
Rimmon-Perez	Nu. 33:19–20		Rarra Rarmun
Libnah	Nu. 33:20–21		Either Wadi el-Beidha or Jebel Libni
Rissah	Nu. 33:21–22		Jebel Ruisset el-Negin
Kehelathah	Nu. 33:22–23		Possibly Kuntillet Ajrud
Mount Shapher	Nu. 33:23–24		Jebel el-Shereif
Haradah	Nu. 33:24–25		Possibly Ras el-Khorasha
Makheloth	Nu. 33:25–26		Perhaps a doublet of Kehelathah (see above)
Tahath	Nu. 33:26–27		
Terah	Nu. 33:27–28		Possibly either Tara umm Haluf or Jebel Taret um-Basis
Mithcah	Nu. 33:28–29		
Hashmonah	Nu. 33:29–30		Possibly Qeseimeh, near Wadi el-Hashmim
Moseroth	Nu. 33:30–31; Dt. 10:6	Aaron's burial place according to Deuteronomy	Bir al-Hafir
Bene-Jaakan	Nu. 33:31–32		Birein near Nabatean Nitzana
Hor Haggidgad	Nu. 33:32–33		Wadi Hadahad
Jotbathah	Nu. 33:33–34		Either Taba on the border between Israel and Jordan (a few miles north of Timna Park) or Tabeh on the Egyptian/Israeli border crossing south of Elath
Abronah	Nu. 33:34–35		‘Ain ed-Defiyeh
Ezion-Geber	Nu. 33:35–36		Tell el-Kheleifeh
Kadesh	Nu. 20:1,22, 33:36–37	Located in the Wilderness of Zin; Miriam's burial place	Tell el-Qudeirat
Mount Hor	Nu. 20:22, 21:4, 33:37–41	On the border of Edom; Aaron's burial place according to Numbers	Possibly Ras el-Khorasha
Zalmonah	Nu. 33:41–42		'Ain es-Salamani
Punon	Nu. 33:42–43		Khirbat Faynan
Oboth	Nu. 21:10–11, 33:43–44		Either 'Ain el-Weiba or Khirbet Ghweibah
Iye Abarim	Nu. 21:11, 33:44–45	On the border of Moab	Proposals include ‘Ayna (along the King’s Highway north of Wadi al-Hasa) or a place south of Wadi al-Hasa
Dibon Gad	Nu. 33:45–46		Dhiban, Jordan
Almon Diblathaim	Nu. 33:46–47		Either Khirbet Deleilat esh-Sherqiyeh or Nitl
Abarim Mountains	Nu. 33:47–48	The Israelites encamped near Mount Nebo	The mountain range of western Moab, overlooking the plains of Moab in the Jordan Valley
Plains of Moab	Nu. 22:1, 33:48–50	The Israelites encamped along the Jordan River from Beth-jeshimoth to Abel-shittim	Lower Jordan Valley, between Sweimeh and Tell el-Hammam, Jordan
