= List of minor biblical tribes =

This list contains tribes or other groups of people named in the Bible of minor notability, about whom either nothing or very little is known, aside from any family connections.

== A ==
=== Accaba, descendants of ===
For the descendants of "Accaba" (1 Esdras 5:30, Revised Version), see the entry for Hagab.

=== Agaba, descendants of ===
For the "Agaba" of 1 Esdras 5:30, see Hagab.

=== Ahumai ===
Ahumai, according to 1 Chronicles 4:2, was the name of a clan within the Tribe of Judah. The name "Ahuman" appears only in this verse of the Hebrew Bible, and manuscripts of the Greek Septuagint read Acheimei, Achimai or Achiman. The Encyclopaedia Biblica raises the possibility that the correct reading is "Ahiman" rather than "Ahumai."

=== Apharsachites ===
A company of the colonists whom the Assyrian king planted in Samaria (Ezra 5:6–7).

=== Apharsathchites ===
Apharsathchites, according to Ezra 4:9, were among the groups of people who wrote a letter to the Persian emperor in opposition to the rebuilding of Jerusalem. The exact spelling "Apharsathchites" occurs only in Ezra 4:9. However, an alternate form of the same name, "Apharsachites," appears in Ezra 5:6 and 6:6. According to the Encyclopaedia Biblica, the term seems to be "the title of certain officers under Darius," and it is "misunderstood" as referring to a tribe of people.

=== Apharsites ===
Another of the tribes removed to Samaria, or perhaps the same as the Apharsachites (Ezra 4:9).

=== Arkites ===
See also Canaan (son of Ham)

Arkites, also Archites were descendants of Canaan, according to Genesis 10:17 and 1 Chronicles 1:15, and were also inhabitants of the land of Canaan, according to Joshua 16:2. David's friend Hushai was an Arkite (2 Samuel 15:32). The Arkites inhabited Arqa, a city in the north of what is now Lebanon

=== Arvadites ===
See also Canaan (son of Ham)

Arvadites were descendants of Canaan, according to Genesis 10:18 and 1 Chronicles 1:16. They inhabited Arvad/Arwad, an island city that is now part of Syria.

=== Asshurites ===
The Asshurites (also called Ashurites or Asshurim) are a group of people who, according to Genesis 25:3, descended from Dedan, the son of Jokshan, the son of Abraham and Keturah. Their exact historical identity is unknown, but the name may refer to an Assyrian or Egyptian tribe, or it may be a generic term for peasants.

== C ==
=== Chemarims ===
In the King James Version of the Bible, people known as "Chemarims" (Hebrew kemarim) are mentioned in Zephaniah 1:4 as people to be punished by God for their associations with idolatry. In most later translations the noun is treated as a common noun meaning "idolatrous priests" or something similar. The underlying Hebrew term also appears in 2 Kings 23:5 and Hosea 10:5, and its precise meaning is not known.

=== Cheran ===
Cheran is the name given to a Horite clan in Genesis 36:28 and 1 Chronicles 1:41. While the passage containing "Cheran" is written as though it were a genealogy of individuals, it expresses the relationship between various Horite clans as they understood by the writer of Genesis.

== D ==
=== Darkon, descendants of ===
In Ezra 2:56 and Nehemiah 7:58, which both reproduce versions of the same list, the bene darkon ("sons" i.e. "descendants" of Darkon) appear as one of the groups of the "descendants of Solomon's servants" said to have returned from the Babylonian captivity to Jerusalem and Judah.

=== Dishon ===
Dishon is a Horite clan name that appears in the Hebrew Bible in 1 Chronicles 1 and Genesis 36. The passages involved are about the relations between Horite clans, but they are written as though the subject matter was the genealogical relationships between individuals, one of them named "Dishon." Dishon is described two times as the fifth son of Seir, but one time he is described as the son of Anah, who is in turn the son of Seir.

== E ==
=== Eleadah ===
Eleadah, Elead, or Eladah is the name of a clan in the tribe of Ephraim, personified as an individual in 1 Chronicles 7:20. The individual who appears in 7:20 is called "Eladah" or "Eleadah" depending on how one translates the Hebrew name, while an "Elead" appears in verse 21. This "Elead" may possibly be a repetition of the same name. It is still uncertain exactly how the Chronicler intended for the names in verses 20 and 21 to relate to one another.

=== Elkoshites ===
The term Elkoshite appears only in Nahum 1:1, where the prophet is called "Nahum the Elkoshite." It would seem to come from the name of a town named "Elkosh," but no such town has been positively identified.

=== Elmadam ===
Elmadam or Elmodam is the name of a figure in the genealogy of Jesus according to Luke. Where the Greek has Elmadam, the Peshitta has Elmodad. The Encyclopaedia Biblica (1899) suggests that the original Semitic name is Elmatham, a form of the name Elnathan.

=== Eshban ===
Eshban is a name found in a genealogy in Genesis and Chronicles. In both genealogies, Eshban is identified as the son of Dishon, the son of Anah, the son of Zibeon, the son of Seir the Horite. The name refers to a Horite clan.

== G ==
=== Gammadim ===
Gammadim (KJV Gammadims) are a group or class of people mentioned only in Ezekiel 27:11, in a passage which lists them, along with various other groups of people, as defenders of Tyre. Some Hebrew manuscripts spell the name as Gammarim, while the Septuagint and other ancient Greek versions interpret it in a wide variety of ways. Some interpreters have taken it to refer to Cimmerians or Capadocians.

The Gammadim are listed alongside Arvadites in Ezekiel, just as the Zemarites (Hebrew Tsemarim) are listed alongside Avadites in Genesis 10:18. Because of this parallel between Zemarites and Gammadim, as well as the similarities in appearance of the two words as written in the consonantal Hebrew text, Thomas Kelly Cheyne believed that the current text of Ezekiel only has "Gammadims" as a result of a scribal error, and that Ezekiel 27:11 originally read "Zemarites."

=== Garmites ===
Garmite (Hebrew, garmi) is a term that appears in passing only once in the Masoretic Text of the Hebrew Bible, in a genealogical passage which mentions a member of the Tribe of Judah referred to as "Keilah the Garmite". Where the Hebrew reads "the garmi", various manuscripts of the Greek Septuagint read "atamei", "the tarmi", or "the garmei". Thomas Kelly Cheyne wrote that the name "Keilah the Garmite" may have been a mistaken form of the originally intended "Keilah the Calebite."

=== Gatam ===
For the Edomite clan name "Gatam," see Gatam.

=== Gazzam ===
Gazzam is the family name of a group of Nethinim in Ezra 2:48 and Nehemiah 7:51. Both instances are in copies of a list which claims to contain the family names of people who returned from the Babylonian captivity to Yehud Medinata.

=== Girgashites ===
Girgashites, or Girgasites, were descendants of Canaan, according to Genesis 10:16 and 1 Chronicles 1:14, and they also were inhabitants of the land of Canaan, according to Genesis 15:21, Deuteronomy 7:1, Joshua 3:10, 24:11, and Nehemiah 9:8. At times, they are not listed along with the other Canaanite tribes inhabiting the Holy Land; according to some, such as Rashi, this is because they left the Land of Israel before the Israelites returned from Egypt.

=== Gibbar ===
For the "sons of Gibbar" see Gibbar.

=== Ginnath ===
For the possible biblical clan-name Ginnath, see Ginath.

== H ==
=== Haahashtari ===
See Haahashtari

=== Habaiah, descendants of ===
For the priestly family in Ezra 2, see Habaiah.

=== Hagab, descendants of ===
The descendants of Hagab, whose name means "grasshopper," are listed among the families of Nethinim, or temple assistants, who returned to Jerusalem from the Babylonian captivity in Ezra 2:46 and the parallel verse, Nehemiah 7:48. The Greek Septuagint manuscripts of Ezra and Nehemiah record the name as Agab or Gaba.

The name also appears in 1 Esdras 5:30, where the Revised Standard Version reads "Hagab" while the King James Version has "Agaba" and the Revised Version "Accaba."

The Book of Acts has a prophet who shared a form of the same name: Agabus.

=== Hagabah, descendants of ===
See Hagabah.

=== Hakupha, descendants of ===
The family Hakupha (also Acipha or Achipha) is listed as a sub-group of the Nethinim in Ezra 2:51, Nehemiah 7:53, and 1 Esdras 5:31. In manuscripts of the Greek Septuagint the name appears in the forms Apheika, Akoupha, Akeipha, and Acheiba. The name might mean "crooked."

=== Hamathites ===
See also Canaan (son of Ham)

Hamathites were descendants of Canaan, according to Genesis 10:18 and 1 Chronicles 1:16. They inhabited the Kingdom of Hamath, located in what is now western Syria and northern Lebanon.

=== Hamulites ===
Hamulites were those who descended from Hamul son of Pharez according to Numbers 26:21.

=== Harhur ===
Harhur is recorded in Ezra 2:51 and Nehemiah 7:53 as the collective name of a group of Nethinim who returned to Judah after the Babylonian captivity. The phrase used to describe this group is b'nei harhur, literally "sons of Harhur," which can be interpreted either as "descendants of [a person named] Harhur" or "people from [a place named] Harhur."

=== Haruphites ===
Haruphite is a term applied to "Shephatiah the Haruphite" in 1 Chronicles 12:6 (or verse 5) in some Bibles. The form "Haruphite" is used in the Qere, or the form of the text as traditionally read out loud in synagogues. The Ketiv, the form of the text written in the main body of the Masoretic Text but not traditionally read aloud in synagogues, calls Sephatiah a "Hariphite." The term "Hariphite" or "Haruphite" may refer to the same group of people called by the family name Hariph.

=== Hashum ===
Hashum is the name of a family or clan listed in Ezra 2:19 as returnees to Jerusalem from the Babylonian captivity. The Book of Ezra records that 233 members of this group returned to Jerusalem. The original pronunciation of the name is uncertain: it may have once been Hashim.

=== Hatita ===
Hatita is the name given to a family or clan of porters in Ezra–Nehemiah's list of people who returned to Yehud Medinata after the Babylonian captivity.

=== Hattil, descendants of ===
See Hattil.

=== Hepherites ===
For information about the Hepherites mentioned in Numbers 26:32, see Hepher.

=== Horonites ===
In the Book of Nehemiah, one of Nehemiah's enemies is called Sanballat the Horonite. Scholars have disagreed as to whether this identifies Sanballat as hailing from Beth-horon (in Samaria) or from Horonaim (in Moab).

== I ==
=== Ishbah ===
Ishbah is the name of a clan mentioned in 1 Chronicles 4:17, to which the people of Eshtemoa belonged. The passage describes relationships between clans and regions in terms of genealogical relationships, personifying them as if individual persons. "Ishbah" is not described as having a named "mother" or "father" in the Hebrew Masoretic Text, but the Greek Septuagint Ishbah is described as the "son" of Jether.

=== Ishvites ===
See Ishvi.

=== Ithran ===
For the Horite clan named Ithran, see Ithran.

== J ==
=== Jahmai ===
Jahmai is the name of a clan in the Tribe of Issachar, mentioned only in 1 Chronicles 7:2.

=== Jakim ===
Jakim is a Priestly division mentioned in 1 Chronicles 24:12. According to 1 Chronicles 24, in the time of David a systematic plan was created, in which priests were divided into twenty-four courses, which were responsible on a rotating basis for carrying out duties related to the temple at Jerusalem. Jakim is listed as the twelfth of the priestly courses.

=== Janai ===
For the clan referred to as Janai or Jaanai, see Janai.

=== Japhlet ===
Japhlet is the name given to a clan in the Tribe of Asher. The Japhlet of Asher should not be confused with the "Japhletites" referred to in Joshua 16:3.

=== Japhletites ===
The Japhletites were a community referred to in Joshua 16:3 located at the western point of the boundary of the land allocated to the tribe of Ephraim in the lots drawn by Joshua and Eleazar. The King James Version refers to "the coast of Japhleti". "This place is now unknown".

== L ==
=== Lahad ===
Lahad, only mentioned in 1 Chronicles 4:2, is the name given for a clan within the Tribe of Judah.

=== Lehabim ===
Lehabim were a people descended from Mizraim, according to Genesis 10:13, 1 Chronicles 1:11. Their exact identity is unknown, but the name may refer to Libyans. See Lubims, Libu, and Ancient Libya.

=== Lubims ===
The Lubims in the Old Testament were the Libyans, an African nation under tribute to Egypt (2 Chronicles 12:3; 16:8). Their territory was apparently near Egypt. They were probably the Mizraite Lehabim.

== M ==
=== Maacathites ===
The term Maacathite, Maachathite, or Maachathi is used to refer to the people of Maacah.

=== Magbish, descendants of ===
The descendants [literally, sons] of Magbish is the name given to a group of 156 people listed in Ezra 2:30 as returning from the Babylonian captivity with Zerubbabel. This group is absent from the parallel list in Nehemiah 7.

=== Mahavites ===
"Eliel the Mahavite" (Hebrew eliel hammahavim) is a figure who appears in some translations of the Bible at 1 Chronicles 11:46. However, due to the plural form of the word translated Mahavite, the Encyclopaedia Biblica suggests that some mistake has occurred at some point in the history of the text, and that the translation "Eliel the Mahavite" "cannot be legitimately obtained from the present state of the text."

=== Malchielites ===
The Malchielites were a group within the Tribe of Asher, who according to 1 Chronicles 7:31, were descended from Asher's grandson Malchiel.

=== Manahathites ===
Manahathites (King James Version spelling Manahethites) were a group mentioned in 1 Chronicles 2:52 and 54, in a genealogical passage concerning the descendants of Caleb of the Tribe of Judah. Chronicles attributes half of the Manahathites to descent from Shobal and the rest to Salma, both of them being descendants of Caleb. Their name is related to the Manahath son of Shobal the Horite, who is mentioned in 1 Chronicles 1:40.

=== Maon ===
Maon, according to Judges 10:12, were a people who, along with the Sidonians and Amalek, oppressed the people of Israel. There is also a location known as Maon mentioned several times in the Bible, but the people by that name are mentioned nowhere but the passage in Judges.

=== Meunim ===
The term Meunim (archaically spelled Mehunim, Mehunims) is used in Chronicles and Ezra-Nehemiah. In 2 Chronicles 26:7, the Meunim appear in a list of Philistine peoples conquered by king Uzziah. In 1 Chronicles 4:40-41, people from the Tribe of Simeon are held to have exterminated "descendants of Ham" and Meunim living east of the Jordan. Finally, Ezra 2:50 and the parallel passage in Nehemiah 7:52 list Meunim among groups of Nethinim returning to Yehud Medinata following the end of the Babylonian captivity.

=== Mezobaites ===
For the term Mesobaite or Mezobaite, see Jaasiel.

=== Mishraites ===
The Mishraites, mentioned only in 1 Chronicles 2:53, where a clan said by the Chronicler to have lived in Kirjath-jearim after the Babylonian captivity.

=== Mithnites ===
In 1 Chronicles 11:43, a man is referred as "Joshaphat the Mithnite."

== N ==
=== Naphtuhim ===
Naphtuhim were a people descended from Mizraim, according to Genesis 10:13, 1 Chronicles 1:11.

=== Nephisim ===
The sons of Nephisim (Nephusim, Nephishesim, Nephushesim) were, according to the books of Ezra and Nehemiah, one of the groups of Nethinim. The Qere and Ketiv system for recording variants gives the forms "Nephisim" and "Nephusim" in Ezra 2:50, and "Nephishesim" and "Nephushesim" in Nehemiah 7:52. These forms appear in two forms of a list of people brought by Ezra from the exile in Babylonia to their homeland in Yehud Medinata.

=== Neziah ===
The sons of Neziah, according to Ezra 2:54 and Nehemiah 7:56, a group of people who, among others, returned with Ezra from the Babylonian captivity.

== P ==
=== Padon ===
The descendants of Padon or sons of Padon (Hebrew bnei Padon) are a group who appear in two versions of the list of returnees to Judah according to the books of Ezra (2:44) and Nehemiah (7:47). In keeping with other Hebrew names of the form bnei X, the bnei Padon might be translated as descendants of Padon, sons of Padon, or people of Padon. No further information about any person or group the name "Padon" appears in the Bible.

=== Paltites ===
One person called a Paltite appears in the Bible "Helez the Paltite" (2 Samuel 23:26), one of David's Mighty Warriors. The name might either identify him as coming from the location Beth Pelet (Hebrew for "House of Pelet"), or else might identify him as a member of the clan named Pelet, identified with Caleb in 1 Chronicles 2:47.

=== Parosh ===
The descendants of Parosh or sons of Parosh (Hebrew bnei Parosh) are mentioned several times in the Books of Ezra and Nehemiah (Ezra 2:3; 8:3; 10:25; Nehemiah 7:8). As with other Hebrew terms of the form bnei X, the bnei Parosh might be translated as descendants of Parosh, sons of Parosh, or people of Parosh. A person by the name of Pedaiah, described as a "son of Parosh" appears in Nehemiah 3:25, is listed among those who helped rebuild the wall of Jerusalem. A mention of the name "Parosh (Hebrew פרעש, "flea")" also appears in Nehemiah 10:14.

=== Pelonites ===
Two individuals are identified by the term "Pelonite" in the Hebrew Bible: Ahijah the Pelonite and Helez the Pelonite, both found in the Chronicles versions of the list of David's Mighty Warriors (1 Chronicles 11:27, 36; 27:10). The term "Pelonite" occurs only here, while Helez is identified in 2 Samuel 23:26 as a Paltite. Because of the earlier form "Paltite," which is likely related to Beth Pelet and/or Pelet, most scholars believe that Pelonite is a scribal error, and that "Paltite" is the original term.

=== Perida ===
The descendants of Perida are listed as one group of Solomon's servants in Nehemiah 7:57. The name appears as Peruda in Ezra 2:55.

=== Pochereth ===
The descendants of Pochereth of Zebaaim are listed as one group of Solomon's servants in Ezra 2:57 and Nehemiah 7:59.

=== Punites ===
The Punites, according to Numbers 26:23, were a clan descended from Puah, in the Tribe of Issachar.

== R ==
=== Reaiah ===
Reaiah is a name which occurs several times in the Hebrew Bible. In 1 Chronicles 4:2, in a passage which uses the format of genealogy as a way of expressing the relations between clans, a Reaiah is described as the "son of Shobal", and is associated with Zorathite clans of the Tribe of Judah.

In a nearby passage, another Reaiah is listed as a "son" of Joel, who is placed in a genealogy of the Tribe of Reuben, but whose relationship to Reuben is not clearly specified (1 Chronicles 5:5, the King James Version spells the name Reaia here). He was the son of Micah and the Father of Baal.

Later, in Ezra-Nehemiah, a group known as the "sons of Reaiah" appear in two versions of a list of clans of the Nethinim (Ezra 2:47, Nehemiah 7:50).

== S ==
=== Sardites ===
According to Numbers 26:26, the Sardites were a clan within the tribe of Zebulun, named after Zebulun's son Sered.

=== Senaah ===
The sons of Senaah (Hebrew bnei Senaah or bnei ha-Senaah) are a group who appear in Ezra and Nehemiah, in two versions of a list of returnees from the Babylonian captivity. According to Ezra 2:35 there were 3,630 members of this group; Nehemiah 7:38 gives the figure 3,930. Nehemiah 3:3, in a listing of various groups involved in rebuilding the wall of Jerusalem, has them working on its Fish Gate.

=== Shaalbonites ===
The term Shaalbonite is mentioned in passing in two biblical passages, both of which list an "Eliahba the Shaalbonite" as one of David's Mighty Warriors (2 Samuel 23:32, 1 Chronicles 11:33). See Shaalbim.

=== Shalmai, descendants of ===
In the lists of clans in Ezra 2 and Nehemiah 7, the "descendants of Shalmai" (literally, "sons of Shalmai") are listed as one of the groups who returned from the Babylonian captivity to Judah (Ezra 2:46, Nehemiah 7:48).

=== Sinites ===
Sinites were a people descended from Canaan, son of Ham, according to Genesis 10:17 and 1 Chronicles 1:15. Most authorities however consider the identity of Sinites uncertain, but that they are possibly a people from the northern part of Lebanon where there are various localities with similar names, such as Sinna, Sinum or Sini, and Syn. Medieval biblical exegete Saadia Gaon identified the Sinites with the indigenous peoples of Tripoli, in Lebanon.

=== Solomon's servants ===
A group called the descendants of Solomon's servants appears in Ezra and Nehemiah. They appear in Ezra 2 (55-58) in a list of returnees from the Babylonian captivity to Yehud Medinata. They are listed after the Nethinim and before a list of returnees who could not prove their genealogical origins. A copy of the same list, with some minor differences, can be found in Nehemiah 7:57-60. In both lists, a total number of 392 people is given, including both the descendants of Solomon's servants and the Nethinim. Nehemiah 11:3 lists them as one of the five classes of persons living in Yehud Medinata: "Israel, the priests, the Levites, the Nethinim, and the descendants of Solomon's servants."

Many scholars have noted a large number of non-Hebrew names both in the lists for Nethinim and "descendants of Solomon's servants," and scholars have connected both groups to biblical traditions about non-Israelite (Canaanite, Gibeonite, and/or Hivite) people being forced into slavery by Joshua and Solomon.

== Z ==
=== Zemarites ===
See also Canaan (son of Ham)

Zemarites were descendants of Canaan, according to Genesis 10:18 and 1 Chronicles 1:16. The Zemarites are thought to have inhabited Sumur, a city near the coast of present-day Syria, although biblical exegete Saadia Gaon held that they formerly inhabited the Syrian town of Homs.

== See also ==
- List of biblical names
- List of minor biblical figures
- Avvites (of Philistia)
