= Prophets in Judaism =

Prophets according to Biblical and rabbinical tradition

The Talmud names 55 prophets (48 male and 7 female) of Judaism and Israel (Hebrew: נְבִיאִים Nəvīʾīm, Tiberian: Năḇīʾīm, "Prophets", literally "spokesmen"). Some texts suggest a large number of lost prophets, or name up to seven prophets outside Israel. In Jewish tradition it is believed that Malachi was the final prophet and that the period of prophecy, Nevuah, ended with Haggai, Zechariah and Malachi (mid-5th century BCE) at which time the "Shechinah departed from Israel".

== Rabbinic tradition ==
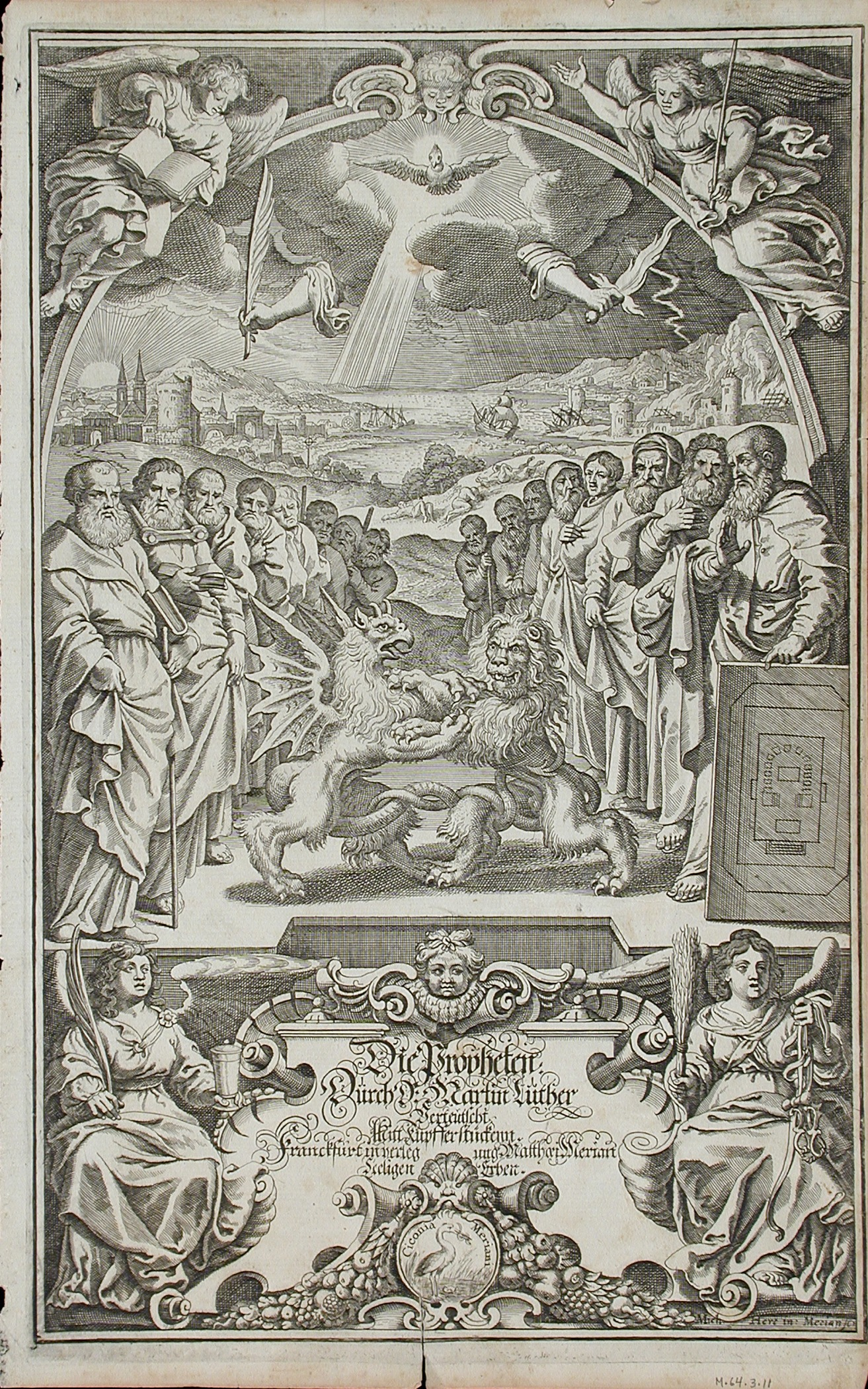
Frontispiece to the Book of Prophets, 17th-century Luther Bible, depicting the Jewish prophets.

According to the Talmud, the Hebrew Bible names 48 prophets and 7 prophetesses who prophesied to Israel. There is no authoritative consensus on who the 48 named prophets are.

=== The 48 prophets to Israel ===
In Rashi's commentary on Tractate Megillah 14a, he names 46 prophets but says he does not know the remaining two. He lists:

- Abraham
- Isaac
- Jacob
- Moses
- Aaron
- Joshua
- Phinehas
- Eli
- Elkanah
- Samuel
- Gad
- Natan
- David
- Ahijah the Shilonite
- Solomon
- Iddo
- Obadiah
- Jehu
- Azariah
- Jahaziel
- Eliezer
- Elijah
- Elisha
- Micaiah
- Jonah
- Amos
- Hosea
- Amoz
- Isaiah
- Micah
- Joel
- Zephaniah
- Nahum
- Habakkuk
- Urijah
- Jeremiah
- Ezekiel
- Daniel
- Mehseiah
- Neriah
- Baruch ben Neriah
- Seraiah ben Neriah
- Haggai
- Zechariah
- Mordechai Bilshan
- Malachi

According to the Vilna Gaon, the two prophets Rashi did not know are:

- Hanani the seer
- Oded

=== The 7 prophetesses to Israel ===
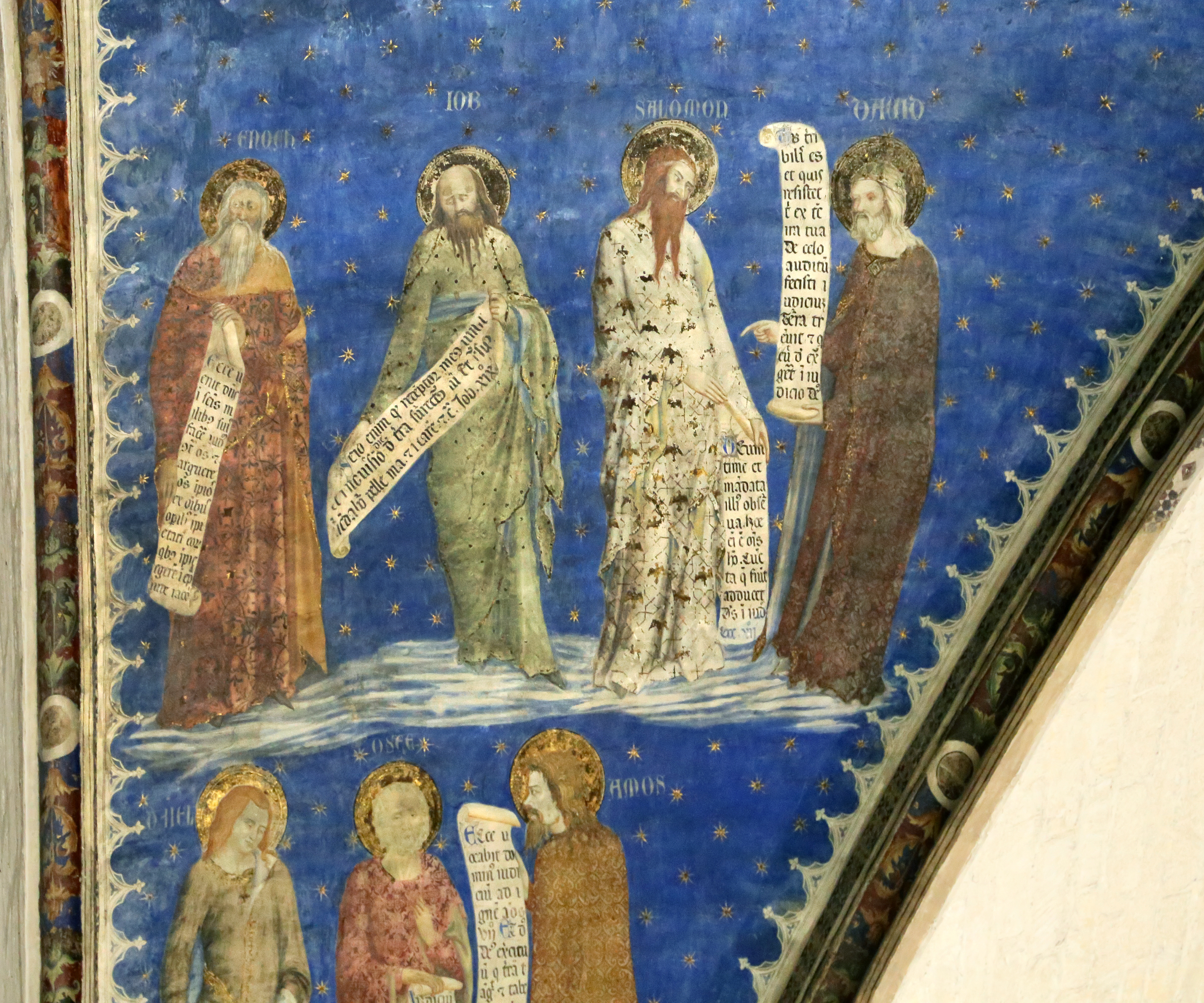
Job, Solomon, David, Hosea, Amos

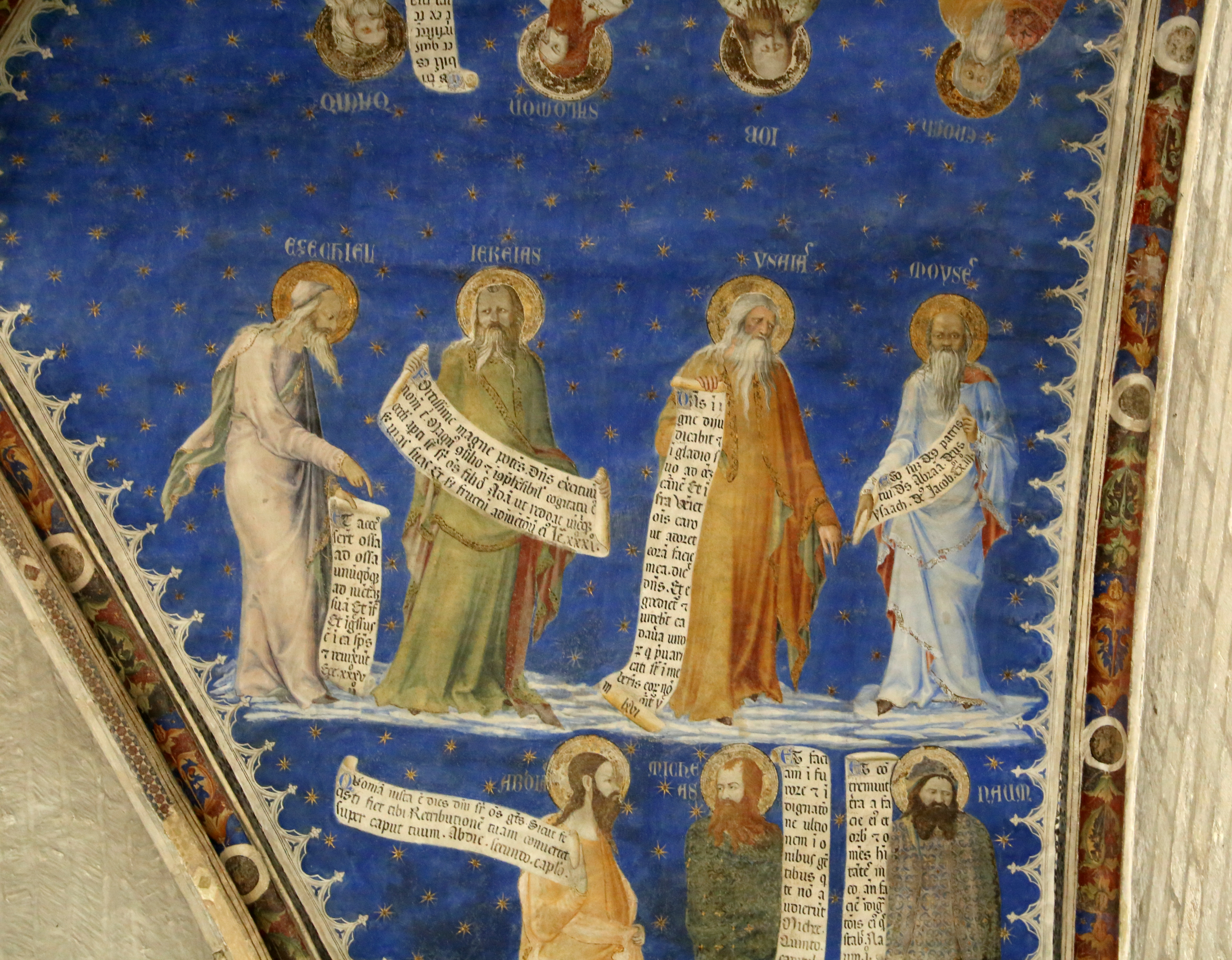
Ezekiel, Jeremiah, Isaiah, Moses
Obadiah, Micah, Nahum

The Old Testament prophets painted by Matteo Giovanetti, 1353.

All rabbinical commentaries name the seven prophetesses as:

- Sarah
- Miriam
- Deborah
- Hannah
- Abigail
- Huldah
- Esther

=== Additional prophets ===
Although the Talmud states that only “48 prophets and 7 prophetesses prophesied to Israel”, it does not mean that there were only 55 prophets. The Talmud challenges this with other examples, and concludes by citing a Baraita tradition that the number of prophets in the era of prophecy was double the number of Israelites who left Egypt (600,000 males). The 55 prophets are recorded, because they made prophecies that have eternal relevance for future generations and not just for their own generation, or own ecstatic encounter with God. Hebrew scripture makes references to groups of such ecstatic prophets, for example in 1 Samuel:

And when they came thither to the hill, behold, a band of prophets met [Saul]; and the spirit of God came mightily upon him, and he prophesied among them. And it came to pass, when all that knew him beforetime saw that, behold, he prophesied with the prophets, then the people said one to another: ‘What is this that is come unto the son of Kish? Is Saul also among the prophets?’ And one of the same place answered and said: ‘And who is their father?’ Therefore it became a proverb: ‘Is Saul also among the prophets?’ And when he had made an end of prophesying, he came to the high place.

On one occasion during the Exodus journey, "the spirit which was upon Moses" was passed to seventy elders, who were also able to prophecy for one time only, but mostly they could not prophecy again. When Eldad and Medad continued to prophecy, Moses expressed the hope that "all the LORD's people" could be prophets.

==== Prophets to other nations ====
The Talmud lists seven prophets to the nations of the world (Gentiles, goyim): Balaam, Beor, Job, Eliphaz, Bildad, Zophar, and Elihu.

== See also ==
- False prophet
- Inés Esteban
- Nathan of Gaza
- Nevi'im
- Table of prophets of Abrahamic religions
