= Hanina ben Pappa =

Jewish scholar

Hanina ben Pappa (Hebrew: חנינה בר פפא) was a Jewish Talmudist living in the Land of Israel, halakhist, and aggadist who flourished in the 3rd and 4th centuries (third generation of amoraim).

His name is variously written "Ḥanina", "Hananiah", and "Ḥinena".

== Biography ==
He was a younger contemporary of Samuel ben Nahman.

That he possessed great stores of learning is shown by the frequency with which he is cited in both Talmud and Midrash, and he enjoyed the companionship of the foremost teachers of his generation. He discussed exegetics with Shimon ben Pazi, and he was associated with Abbahu and Rabbi Isaac Nappaha on the judiciary.

It is told that Hanina was very charitable, and distributed his gifts at night so as not to expose the recipients to shame. But as the night is assigned to the evil spirits, his procedure displeased the latter. Once the chief of the spirits met him and asked, "Do you not teach the Biblical inhibition, 'You shall not remove your neighbor's landmark'? Why then do you invade my province?" Hanina answered, "Does not the Bible also teach, 'A gift in secret pacifies anger'?" thus reminding the spirit that no evil could befall him. On hearing this the spirit became disheartened and fled.

Hanina is reputed to have been providentially guarded against errors of judgment. Once he made a mistake in connection with a mourning, and in the succeeding night was corrected by a dream in which he heard the message, "You have disobeyed the mouth of the Lord".

It is told that Hanina had a friendship with the Angel of Death. When his time came to die, the angel came to inform Hanina. Hanina requested a 30-day delay in which to review his studies (in accordance with the saying "Happy is one who comes to [the World to Come] with his studies in his hand"). After 30 days, Hanina asked the angel to show him Hanina's place in the World to Come, and the angel agreed. Hanina then asked the angel to give him his knife, so as not to scare Hanina on the way. When the angel heard this, it remembered an incident where Rabbi Joshua ben Levi had similarly requested the knife, and then took the opportunity to escape. The angel therefore tried to push off the request, saying "Do you think you are on the level of Rabbi Joshua ben Levi?" The angel described an incident in which Joshua had shown his righteousness in a way Hanina had not, and Hanina was left without an answer. Nevertheless, when Hanina died, due to his greatness a pillar of fire appeared to separate his body from the living.

== Teachings ==
Many of Hanina's aggadic teachings are recorded in the Talmud. In his public lectures Hanina frequently illustrated God's wisdom as manifested in nature, and expressed many eschatological thoughts. Starting with Isaiah 43:9 ("Let all the nations be gathered together, and let the people be assembled: who among them can declare this, and show us former things? let them bring forth their witnesses, that they may be justified"), he delivered the following homily, perhaps the longest and most connected of all aggadot:

In the future the Holy One—blessed be He!—will take a scroll of the Law, and invite all who have observed its behests to appear and receive their due reward. All nations will come promiscuously, but the Lord will say, "Let each nation with its historians come in singly." Edom (Rome) will then appear, when the Lord will ask, "Wherewith have ye occupied yourselves?" Edom will answer, "Lord of the Universe, we have erected many market-places, built many baths, amassed silver and gold: all this we did that the children of Israel might devote themselves to the practise of the Law." Thereupon God will say, "Consummate knaves, whatever ye have accomplished ye have done from self-interest; ye have erected market-places to people them with prostitutes; built baths to benefit yourselves; and as for the silver and the gold, that is Mine. But is there one among you that can tell about this [Law]?" As soon as they hear they will depart crestfallen, and Persia will enter. To the question as to their occupation the Persians will answer that they have built bridges, conquered cities, and waged wars, all to afford Israel opportunities for keeping the Law. However, they too will be rebuked by the Lord, who will point out that whatever they have done has been prompted by selfish motives; they in turn will be asked, "who of you can declare this [Law]?" Persia will then depart in confusion; so it will go with every other nation except Israel. At last the nations will protest, "Lord of the Universe, did You ever offer us the Law, and we fail to receive it?" To which the Lord will rejoin: "Show us former things; I have offered you seven precepts, which you accepted; did you keep them?" Whereupon they will ask, "And did Israel keep the Law?" Then the Lord will say, "I Myself bear witness that Israel did." The nations: "May a father bear witness for a son? You have said, 'Israel is my son, my firstborn.'" The Lord: "Then heaven and earth will testify." The nations: "Heaven and earth are interested witnesses, for the Bible says, 'Were it not for My covenant to be kept day and night, I should not have appointed the ordinances of heaven and earth.'" The Lord: "From among yourselves witnesses will come and testify that Israel has faithfully kept the Law. Nimrod can testify that Abraham did not worship idols; Laban can testify that there was no ground for suspecting Jacob of misappropriation; Potiphar's wife can testify that Joseph could not be suspected of immorality; Nebuchadnezzar can testify that Hananiah, Mishael, and Azariah never bowed to an image; Darius can testify that Daniel never neglected prayer; Bildad the Shuhite, and Zophar the Naamathite, and Eliphaz the Temanite can testify that Israel has kept the Law." Then the nations will propose: "Give us the reward in advance, and we will keep the Law." Thereunto the Lord will answer, "Whoever toiled on the eve of the Sabbath (i.e., stored up good deeds against the time when nothing more could be done) may feast on the Sabbath-day; but whoever did not toil on the eve of the Sabbath, on what can he feast during the Sabbath?'
