= Mehseiah =

Minor figure in the Hebrew Bible

Mehseiah is a minor figure in the Hebrew Bible, the grandfather of Baruch ben Neriah and father of Neriah. According to the Talmud, he was a prophet.
