= Apocalypse of Baruch =

The books titled Apocalypse of Baruch are different Jewish pseudepigraphical texts written in the centuries after the fall of Jerusalem to the Romans in 70 AD, though attributed to Baruch ben Neriah (c. 6th century BC).

- Syriac Apocalypse of Baruch or 2 Baruch which predominantly survives in Syriac manuscripts
- Greek Apocalypse of Baruch or 3 Baruch which predominantly survives in Greek manuscripts
- Ethiopic Apocalypse of Baruch or 5 Baruch which seems to have been composed in Ethiopic

== See also ==
- Book of Baruch, also known as 1 Baruch
- 4 Baruch, also known as Paralipomena of Jeremiah
- Rest of the Words of Baruch, also known as Ethiopic Lamentations of Jeremiah
