= Book of Job =

Book of the Bible

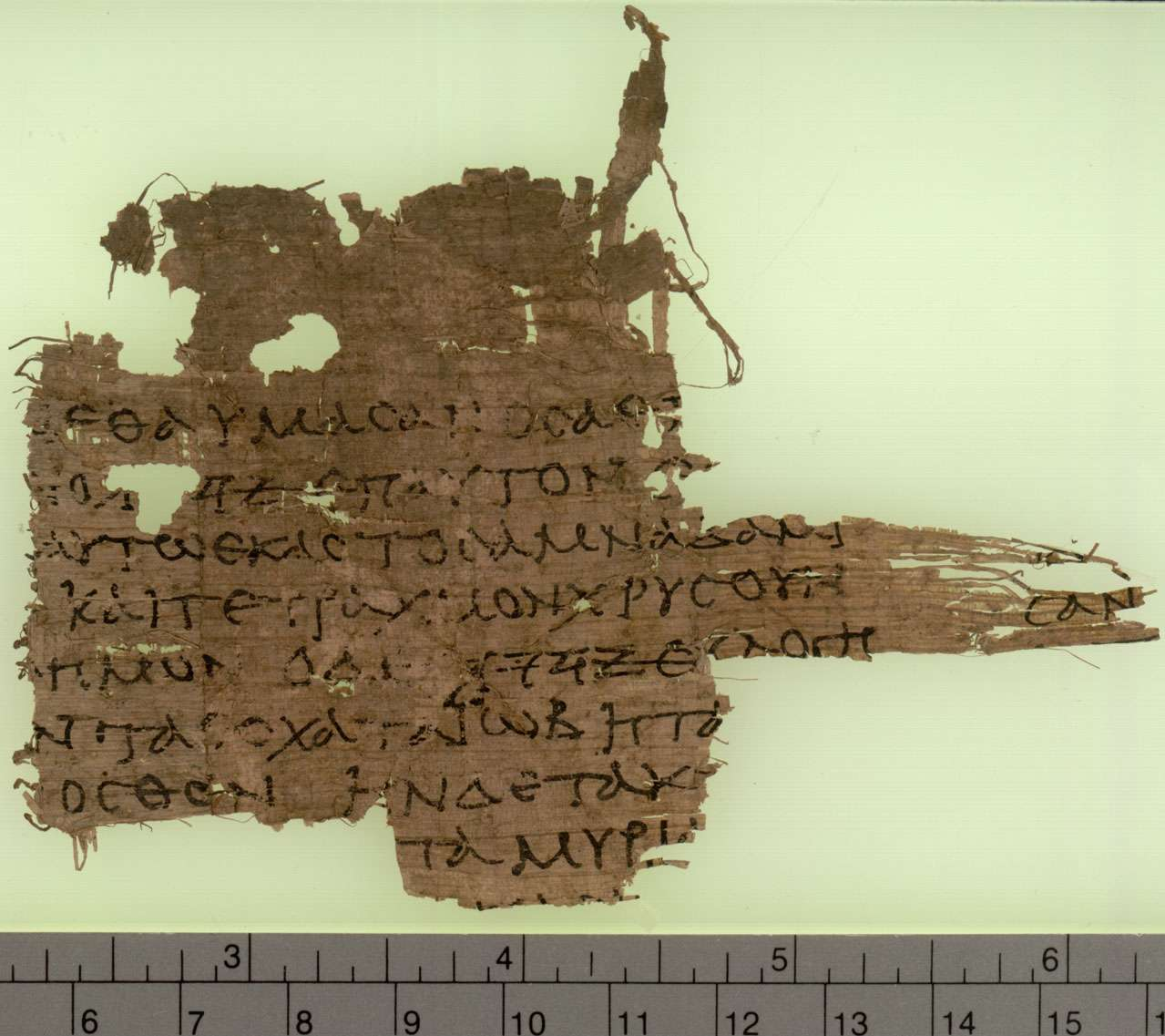
Papyrus Oxyrhynchus 3522 (dated to the 1st century CE) contains a partial translation of Job 42 into Koine Greek.

The Book of Job (Biblical Hebrew: אִיּוֹב, romanized: ʾĪyyōḇ), or simply Job, is a book found in the Ketuvim ('Writings') section of the Hebrew Bible and the first of the Poetic Books in the Old Testament of the Christian Bible.

The language of the Book of Job, combining post-Babylonian Hebrew and Aramaic influences, indicates it was composed during the Persian period (540–330 BCE), with the poet using Hebrew in a learned, literary manner. It addresses the problem of evil, providing a theodicy through the experiences of the eponymous protagonist. It is structured with a prose prologue and epilogue framing poetic dialogues and monologues, including three cycles of debates between Job and his friends, Job's lamentations, the Poem to Wisdom, Elihu's speeches, and God's two speeches from a whirlwind.

Job is a wealthy God-fearing man with a comfortable life and a large family. God discusses Job's piety with a character called the adversary (הַשָּׂטָן, ha-sāṭān, lit. 'the adversary'; i.e. "the satan"). The adversary rebukes God, stating that Job would turn away from God if he were to lose everything within his possession. God decides to test that theory by allowing the adversary to inflict pain on Job. Job is tested through extreme suffering, including the loss of his wealth, children, and health, yet he maintains his piety while challenging the justice of God. Job defends himself against his unsympathetic friends, whom God admonishes. The dialogues explore human frailty and the inaccessibility of divine wisdom, culminating in God highlighting His omnipotence and Job confessing his limited understanding. In the epilogue, Job's fortunes are restored twofold and the same number of sons and daughters are born that had died.

The book has influenced Jewish and Christian theology and liturgy, as well as Western culture. It parallels wisdom traditions from Mesopotamia and Egypt. In Islam, Job (Ayyub) is revered as a prophet exemplifying steadfast faith.

== Structure ==
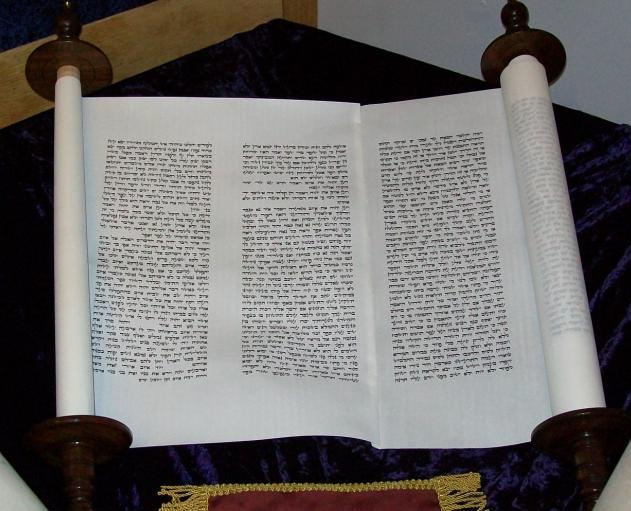
A scroll of the Book of Job, in Hebrew

The Book of Job consists of a prose prologue and epilogue narrative framing poetic dialogues and monologues. It is common to view the narrative frame as the original core of the book, enlarged later by the poetic dialogues and discourses, and sections of the book such as the Elihu speeches and the wisdom poem of chapter 28 as late insertions, but recent trends have tended to concentrate on the book's underlying editorial unity.

1. Prologue: in two scenes, the first on Earth, the second in Heaven
2. Job's opening monologue – seen by some scholars as a bridge between the prologue and the dialogues and by others as the beginning of the dialogues – and three cycles of dialogues between Job and his three friends; the third cycle is not complete, the expected speech of Zophar being replaced by the wisdom poem of chapter 28.
  - First cycle:
  - Eliphaz and Job's response
  - Bildad and Job
  - Zophar and Job
  - Second cycle:
  - Eliphaz and Job
  - Bildad and Job
  - Zophar and Job
  - Third cycle:
  - Eliphaz and Job
  - Bildad and Job
3. Three monologues:
  - A Poem to Wisdom (Note: Chapter 28, previously read as part of the speech of Job, is now regarded by most scholars as a separate interlude in the narrator's voice.)
  - Job's closing monologue
  - and Elihu's speeches
4. Three speeches by God, with Job's responses
5. Epilogue – Job's restoration

== Contents ==
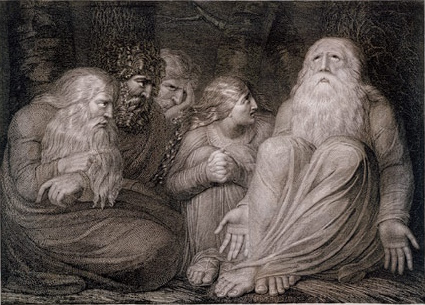
Job's Tormentors from William Blake's Illustrations for the Book of Job

=== Prologue on Earth and in Heaven ===
In chapter 1, the prologue on Earth introduces Job as a righteous man, blessed with wealth, sons, and daughters, who lives in the land of Uz. The scene then shifts to Heaven, where God asks Satan (Biblical Hebrew: הַשָּׂטָן, romanized: ha-sāṭān, lit. 'the adversary') for his opinion of Job's piety. Satan accuses Job of being pious only because he believes God is responsible for his happiness; if God were to take away everything that Job has, then he would surely curse God.

God gives Satan permission to strip Job of his wealth and kill his children, servants, and animals, but Job nonetheless praises God:

Naked I came from my mother's womb, and naked shall I return there; the Lord gave, and the Lord has taken away; blessed be the name of the Lord.

In chapter 2, God further allows Satan to afflict Job's body with disfiguring and painful boils. As Job sits in the ashes of his former estate, his wife prompts him to "curse God, and die", but Job answers:

You speak as any foolish woman would speak. Shall we receive the good at the hand of God, and not receive the bad?

=== Job's opening monologue and dialogues between Job and his three friends ===
In chapter 3, "instead of cursing God", Job laments the night of his conception and the day of his birth; he longs for death, "but it does not come".

His three friends, Eliphaz the Temanite, Bildad the Shuhite, and Zophar the Naamathite, visit him. For seven days and nights they mourn with him, but afterwards they accuse him of sinning, and tell him that his suffering was deserved. Job responds with scorn, calling his visitors "miserable comforters". Job asserts that since a just God would not treat him so harshly, patience in suffering is impossible, and the Creator should not take his creatures so lightly, to come against them with such force.

Job's responses represent one of the most radical restatements of Israelite theology in the Hebrew Bible. He moves away from the pious attitude shown in the prologue and begins to berate God for the disproportionate wrath against him. He sees God as, among others,

- intrusive and suffocating
- unforgiving and obsessed with destroying a human target
- angry
- fixated on punishment
- hostile and destructive

Job then shifts his focus from the injustice that he himself suffers to God's governance of the world. He suggests that God does nothing to punish the wicked, who have taken advantage of the needy and the helpless, who, in turn, have been left to suffer the significant hardships inflicted on them.

=== Three monologues: Poem to Wisdom, Job's closing monologue ===
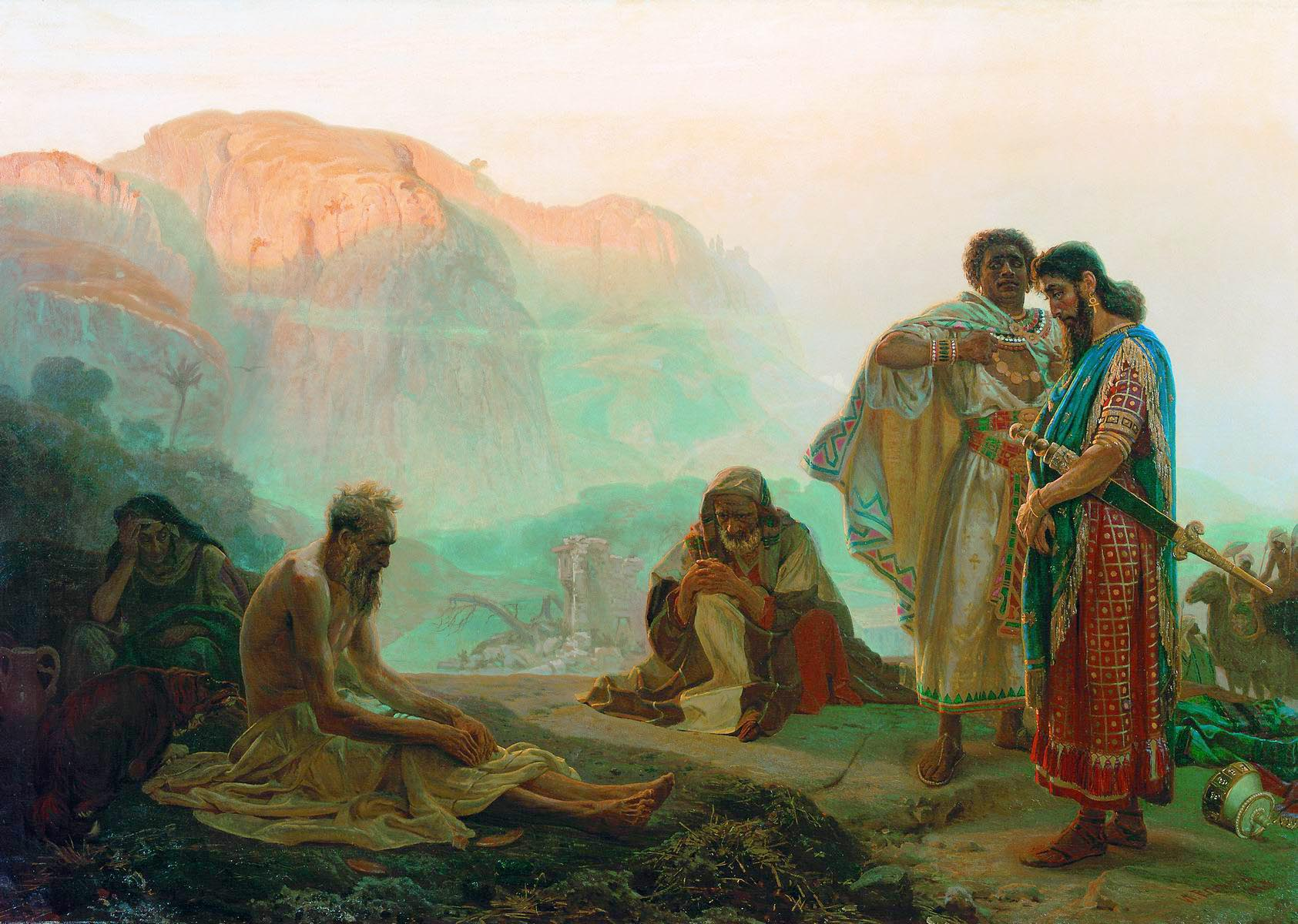
Job and His Friends by Ilya Repin (1869)

The dialogues of Job and his friends are followed by a poem (the "hymn to wisdom") on the inaccessibility of wisdom: "Where is wisdom to be found?" it asks; it concludes in chapter 28 that wisdom has been hidden from humankind. Job contrasts his previous fortune with his present plight as an outcast, mocked and in pain. He protests his innocence, lists the principles he has lived by, and demands that God answer him.

=== Elihu's speeches ===
A character not previously mentioned, Elihu, intrudes into the story and occupies chapters 32–37. The narrative describes him as stepping out of a crowd of bystanders irate. He intervenes to state that wisdom comes from God, who reveals it through dreams and visions to those who will then declare their knowledge.

=== Two speeches by God ===
From chapter 38, God speaks from a whirlwind. God's speeches do not explain Job's suffering, defend divine justice, enter into the courtroom of confrontation that Job has demanded, nor respond to his oath of innocence of which the narrative prologue shows God is well aware.

Instead, God changes the subject to human frailty and contrasts Job's weakness with divine wisdom and omnipotence: "Where were you when I laid the foundations of the earth?" Job responds briefly, but God's monologue resumes, never addressing Job directly.

In Job 42:1–6, Job makes his final response, confessing God's power and his own lack of knowledge "of things beyond me which I did not know". Previously, he has only heard God, but now his eyes have seen God, and therefore, he declares, "I retract and repent in dust and ashes".

=== Epilogue ===
God tells Eliphaz that he and the two other friends "have not spoken of me what is right as my servant Job has done".

The three are told to make a burnt offering with Job as their intercessor, "for only to him will I show favour". Elihu, the critic of Job and his friends, is notably omitted from this part of the narrative.

The epilogue describes Job's health being regained, his fortunes restored twofold and the same number of sons and daughters being born as he had before. Job lived to see the new children produce grandchildren up to the fourth generation.

=== Additions to Job ===
Among other alterations to the Book of Job, the Septuagint features an extended epilogue, which, continuing from the end of 42:17, confirms that Job will be resurrected with the righteous. The addition further identifies Job with Jobab in Genesis, the great-grandson of Esau and a king of Edom. Furthermore, Eliphaz in the story of Job is identified as Esau's firstborn son, Eliphaz, and the king of Taiman; Baldad is noted as the ruler of the Sauchites, and Sophar is noted as the king of the Minneans.

The addition contains several parallels with the writings of Aristeas the Exegete, quoted by Alexander Polyhistor who in turn was quoted in Eusebius in Praeparatio Evangelica 9.25.1-4.

== Composition ==
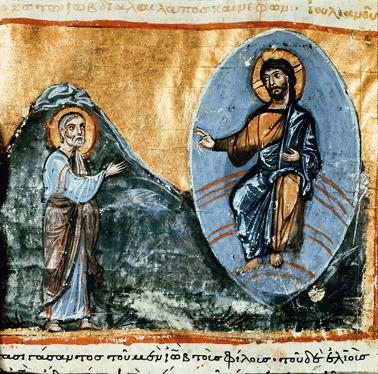
Anonymous Byzantine illustration; the pre-incarnate Christ speaks to Job

=== Authorship, language, texts ===
A figure named Job appears in the Book of Ezekiel (c. 6th-century BCE) as an exemplary righteous man of antiquity. However, this is probably not the exact same Job as is in the Book of Job; the author of the Book of Job likely expanded upon an earlier legend of Job.

The language of the Book of Job, combining post-Babylonian Hebrew and Aramaic influences, indicates it was composed during the Persian period (540–330 BCE), with the poet using Hebrew in a learned, literary manner. The anonymous author was almost certainly an Israelite—although the story is set outside Israel, in southern Edom or northern Arabia—and alludes to places as far apart as Mesopotamia and Egypt. Despite the Israelite origins, it appears that the Book of Job was composed in a time in which wisdom literature was common but not acceptable to Judean sensibilities (i.e., during the Babylonian exile and shortly thereafter).

The speeches of Elihu differ in style from the rest of the book, and neither God nor Job appear to take any note of what he has said; as a result, it is widely believed that Elihu's speeches are a later addition by another author.

The language of Job stands out for its conservative spelling and exceptionally large number of words and word forms not found elsewhere in the Bible. Many later scholars, down to the 20th century, have looked for an Aramaic, Arabic, or Edomite origin, but a close analysis suggests that the foreign words and foreign-looking forms are literary affectations designed to lend authenticity to the book's distant setting and give it a foreign flavor.

=== Modern revisions ===
Job exists in a number of forms: the Hebrew Masoretic Text, which underlies many modern Bible translations; the Greek Septuagint made in Egypt in the last centuries BCE; and Aramaic and Hebrew manuscripts found among the Dead Sea Scrolls.

In the Latin Vulgate, the New Revised Standard Version, and in Protestant Bibles, it is placed after the Book of Esther as the first of the poetic books. In the Hebrew Bible, it is located within the Ketuvim. John Hartley notes that in Sephardic manuscripts, the texts are ordered as Psalms, Job, and Proverbs, but in Ashkenazic texts, the order is Psalms, Proverbs, and then Job. In the Catholic Jerusalem Bible, it is described as the first of the "wisdom books" and follows the two books of the Maccabees.

=== Job and the wisdom tradition ===
Job, Ecclesiastes, and the Book of Proverbs belong to the genre of wisdom literature, sharing a perspective that they themselves call the "way of wisdom". Wisdom means both a way of thinking and a body of knowledge gained through such thinking, as well as the ability to apply it to life. In its Biblical application in wisdom literature, it is seen as attainable in part through human effort and in part as a gift from God, but never in its entirety—except by God.

The three books of wisdom literature share attitudes and assumptions but differ in their conclusions: Proverbs makes confident statements about the world and its workings that Job and Ecclesiastes flatly contradict. Wisdom literature from Sumeria and Babylonia can be dated to the third millennium BCE. Several texts from ancient Mesopotamia and Egypt offer parallels to Job, and while it is impossible to tell whether any of them influenced the author of Job, their existence suggests that the author was the recipient of a long tradition of reflection on the existence of inexplicable suffering.

== Themes ==
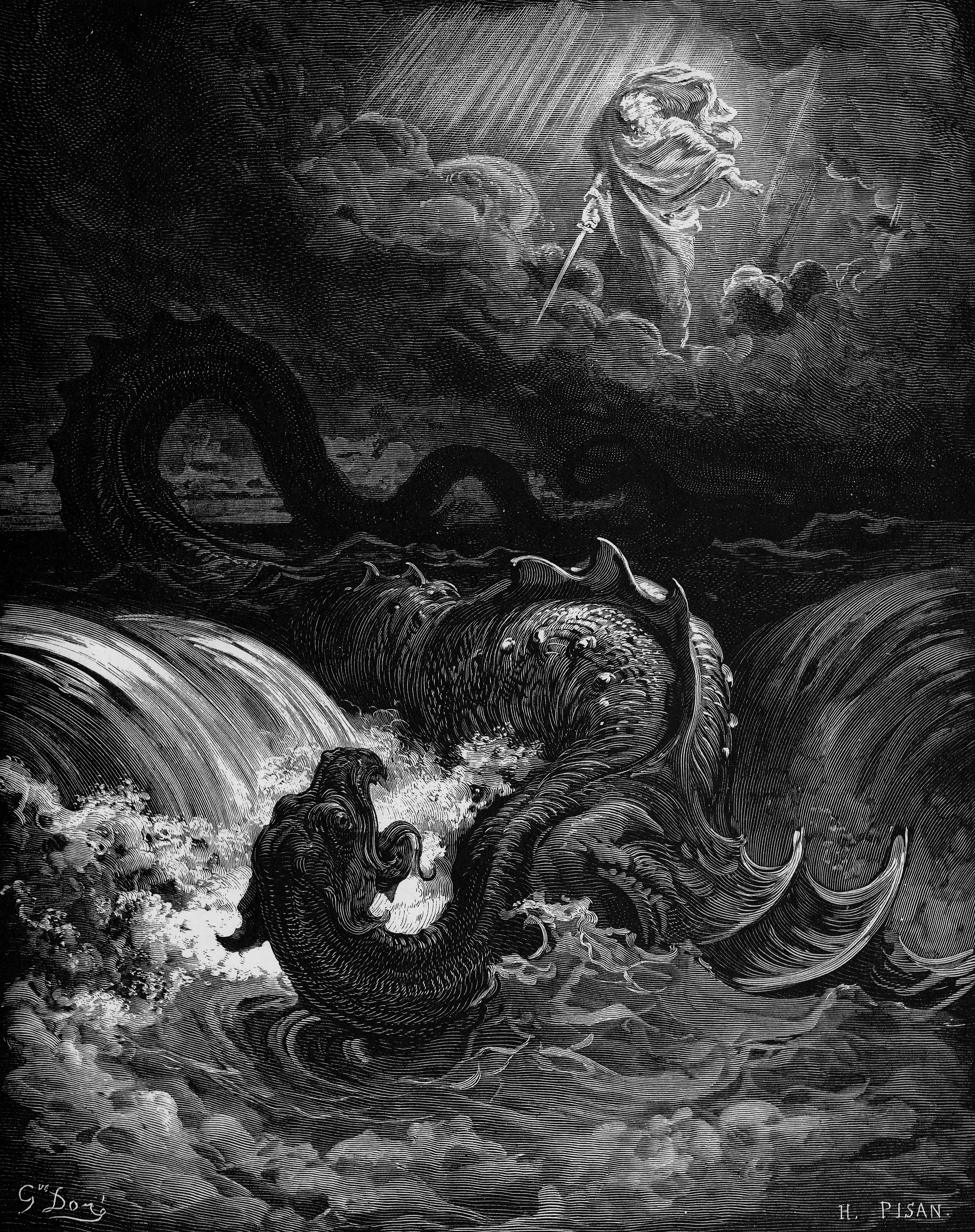
The Destruction of Leviathan by Gustave Doré (1865)

The Book of Job is an investigation of the problem of divine justice. This problem, known in theology as the problem of evil or theodicy, can be rephrased as a question: "Why do the righteous suffer?" The conventional answer in ancient Israel was that God rewards virtue and punishes sin (the principle known as "retributive justice"). According to this view the moral status of human choices and actions is consequential, but experience demonstrates that suffering is experienced by those who are good.

The biblical concept of righteousness was rooted in the covenant-making God who had ordered creation for communal well-being, and the righteous were those who invested in the community, showing special concern for the poor and needy (see Job's description of his life in chapter 31). Their antithesis were the wicked, who were selfish and greedy. The Satan (or the Adversary) raises the question of whether there is such a thing as disinterested righteousness: if God rewards righteousness with prosperity, will men not act righteously from selfish motives? He asks God to test this by removing the prosperity of Job, the most righteous of all God's servants.

The book begins with the frame narrative, giving the reader an omniscient "God's eye perspective" which introduces Job as a man of exemplary faith and piety, "blameless and upright", who "fears God" and "shuns evil". The contrast between the frame and the poetic dialogues and monologues, in which Job never learns of the opening scenes in heaven or of the reason for his suffering, creates a sense of dramatic irony between the divine view of the Adversary's wager, and the human view of Job's suffering "without any reason" (2:3).

In the poetic dialogues Job's friends see his suffering and assume he must be guilty, since God is just. Job, knowing he is innocent, concludes that God must be unjust. He retains his piety throughout the story (contradicting the Adversary's suspicion that his righteousness is due to the expectation of reward), but makes clear from his first speech that he agrees with his friends that God should and does reward righteousness.

The intruder, Elihu, rejects the arguments of both parties:

- Job is wrong to accuse God of injustice, as God is greater than human beings, and
- the visitors are not correct either; for suffering, far from being a punishment, may "rescue the afflicted from their affliction".

That is, suffering can make those afflicted more amenable to revelation – literally, "open their ears" (Job 36:15).

Chapter 28, the Poem (or Hymn) to Wisdom, introduces another theme: Divine wisdom. The hymn does not place any emphasis on retributive justice, stressing instead the inaccessibility of wisdom. Wisdom cannot be invented or purchased, it says; God alone knows the meaning of the world, and he grants it only to those who live in reverence before him. God possesses wisdom because he grasps the complexities of the world (Job 28:24–26) – a theme which anticipates God's speech in chapters 38–41, with its repeated refrain "Where were you when ...?"

When God finally speaks he neither explains the reason for Job's suffering (known to the reader to be unjust, from the prologue set in heaven) nor defends his justice. The first speech focuses on his role in maintaining order in the universe: The list of things that God does and Job cannot do demonstrates divine wisdom because order is the heart of wisdom. Job then confesses his lack of wisdom, meaning his lack of understanding of the workings of the cosmos and of the ability to maintain it. The second speech concerns God's role in controlling the formidable 'behemoth' and 'leviathan'. (Note: The Hebrew words behemoth and leviathan are sometimes naturalistically translated as the 'hippopotamus' and 'crocodile', but more probably representing more ominous primeval cosmic monsters or chaotic forces, in either case demonstrating God's wisdom and power.)

Job's reply to God's final speech is longer than his first and more complicated. The usual view is that he admits to being wrong to challenge God and now repents "in dust and ashes" (Job 42:6), but the Hebrew is difficult: An alternative reading is that Job says he was wrong to repent and mourn, and does not retract any of his arguments.

In the concluding part of the frame narrative God restores and increases Job's prosperity, indicating that the divine policy on retributive justice remains unchanged.

== Influence and interpretation ==
=== History of interpretation ===
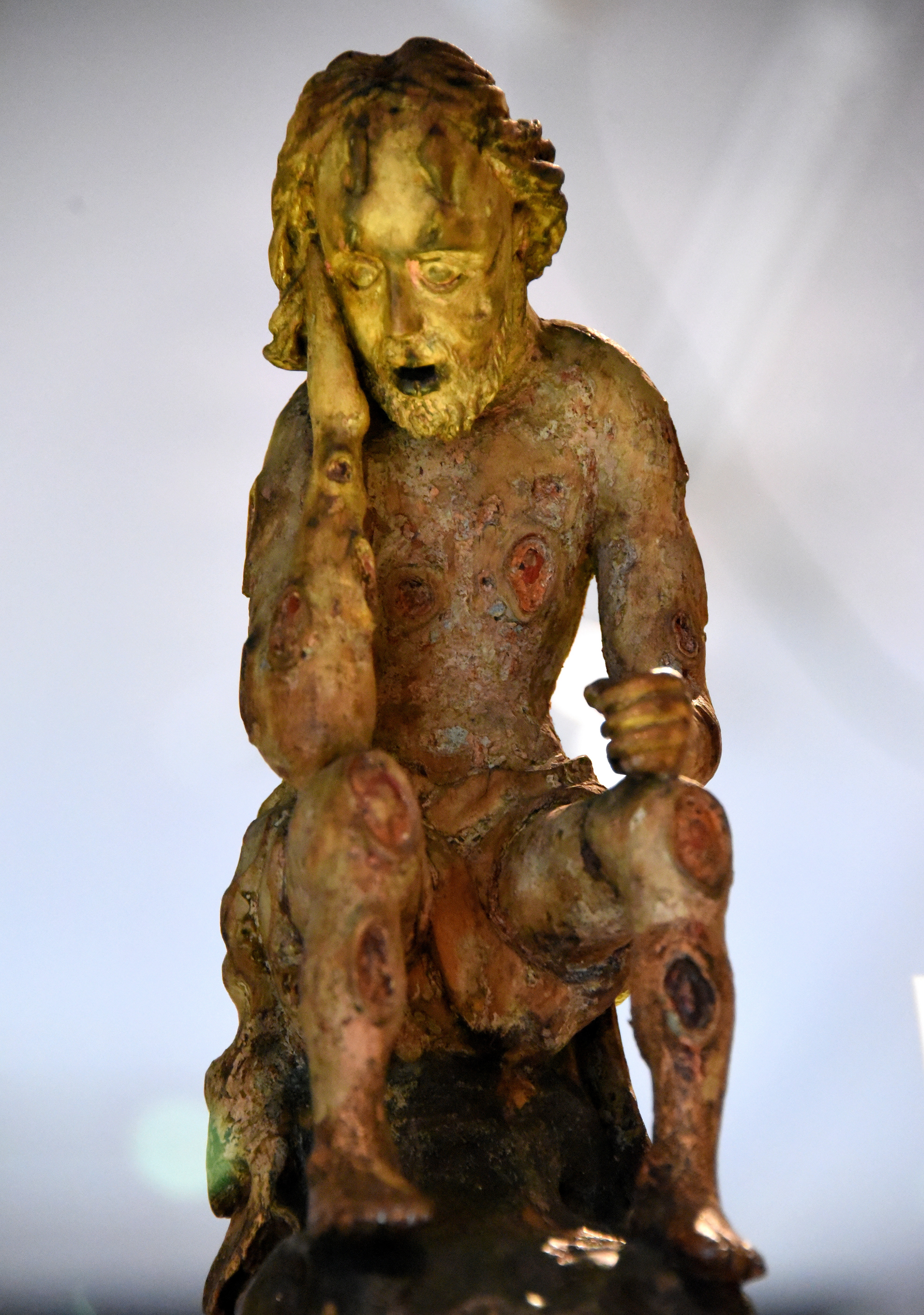
A carved wooden figure of Job. Probably from Germany, 1750–1850 CE. The Wellcome Collection, London

In the Second Temple period (500 BCE–70 CE), the character of Job began to be transformed into something more patient and steadfast, with his suffering a test of virtue and a vindication of righteousness for the glory of God. The process of "sanctifying" Job began with the Greek Septuagint translation (c. 200 BCE) and was furthered in the apocryphal Testament of Job (1st century BCE–1st century CE), which makes him the hero of patience. This reading pays little attention to the Job of the dialogue sections of the book, but it was the tradition taken up by the Epistle of James in the New Testament, which presents Job as one whose patience and endurance should be emulated by believers (James 5:7–11).

When Christians began interpreting Job 19:23–29 (verses concerning a "redeemer" who Job hopes can save him from God) as a prophecy of Christ, the predominant Jewish view became "Job the blasphemer", with some rabbis even saying that he was rightly punished by God because he had stood by while Pharaoh massacred the innocent Jewish infants.

Augustine of Hippo recorded that Job had prophesied the coming of Christ, and Pope Gregory I offered him as a model of right living worthy of respect. The medieval Jewish scholar Maimonides declared his story a parable, and the medieval Christian Thomas Aquinas wrote a detailed commentary declaring it true history. In the Protestant Reformation, Martin Luther explained how Job's confession of sinfulness and worthlessness underlay his saintliness, and John Calvin's interpretation of Job demonstrated the doctrine of the resurrection and the ultimate certainty of divine justice.

The contemporary movement known as creation theology, an ecological theology valuing the needs of all creation, interprets God's speeches in Job 38–41 to imply that his interests and actions are not exclusively focused on humankind.

=== Liturgical use ===
Jewish liturgy does not use readings from the Book of Job in the manner of the Pentateuch, Prophets, or Five Megillot, although it is quoted at funerals and times of mourning. However, there are some Jews, particularly the Spanish and Portuguese Jews, who do hold public readings of Job on the Tisha B'Av fast (a day of mourning over the destruction of the First and Second Temples and other tragedies). The cantillation signs for the large poetic section in the middle of the Book of Job differ from those of most of the biblical books, using a system shared with it only by Psalms and Proverbs.

The Eastern Orthodox Church reads from Job and Exodus during Holy Week; Exodus prepares for the understanding of Christ's exodus to His Father and his fulfillment of the whole history of salvation, while Job, the sufferer, is viewed as the Old Testament icon of Christ.

The Roman Catholic Church reads from Job during Matins in the first two weeks of September and in the Office of the Dead, and in the revised Liturgy of the Hours Job is read during the Fifth, Twelfth, and Twenty Sixth Week in Ordinary Time.

In the modern Roman Rite, the Book of Job is read during:

- 5th and 12th Sunday in Ordinary Time – Year B
- Weekday Reading for the 26th Week in Ordinary Time – Year II Cycle
- Ritual Masses for the Anointing of the Sick and Viaticum – First Reading options
- Masses for the Dead – First Reading options

=== In music, art, literature, and film ===
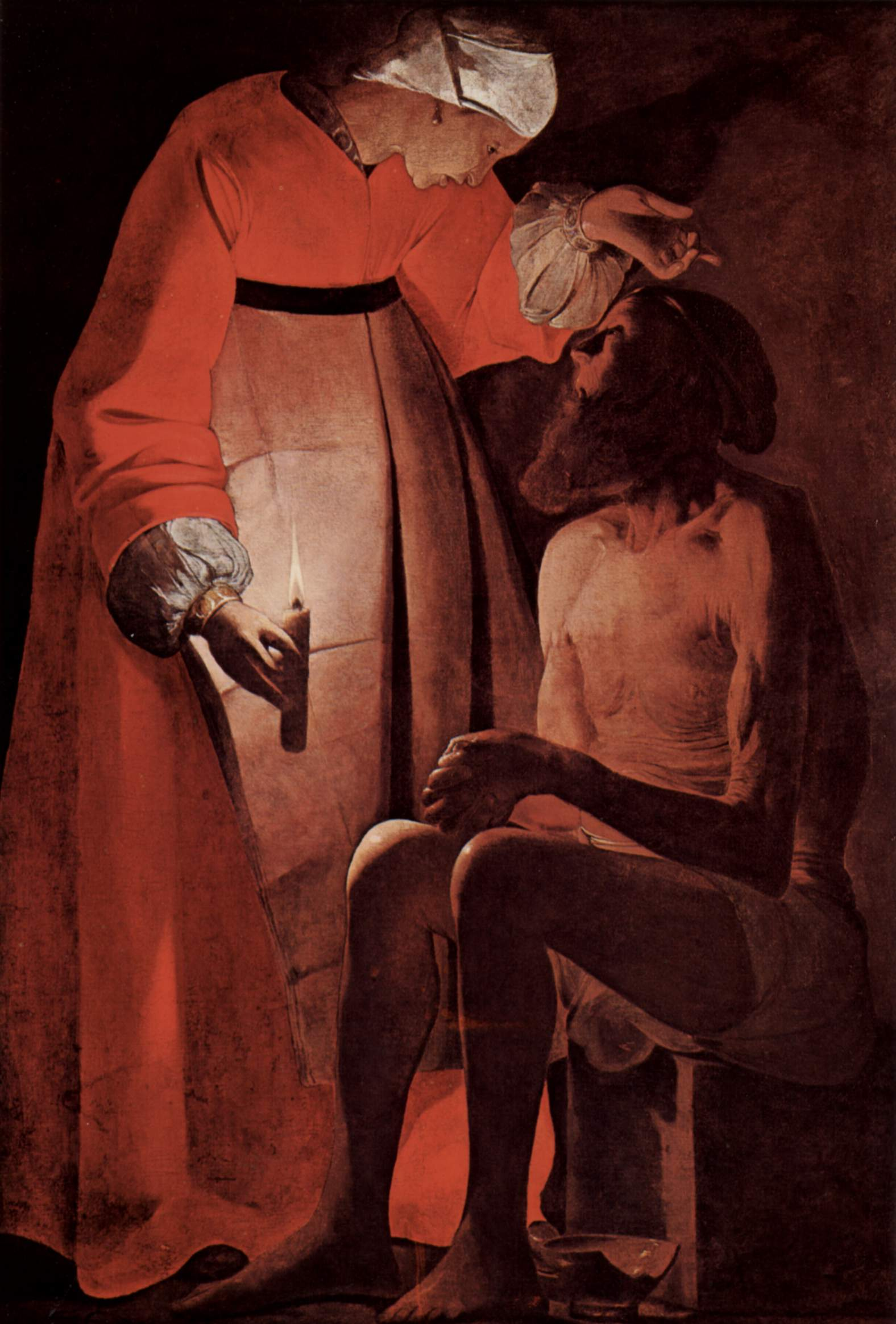
Georges de La Tour, Job Mocked by his Wife

The Book of Job has been deeply influential in Western culture, to such an extent that no list could be more than representative. Musical settings from Job include Orlande de Lassus's 1565 cycle of motets, the Sacrae Lectiones Novem ex Propheta Iob, and George Frideric Handel's use of Job 19:25 ("I know that my redeemer liveth") as an aria in his 1741 oratorio Messiah.

Modern works based on the book include Ralph Vaughan Williams's Job: A Masque for Dancing; French composer Darius Milhaud's Cantata From Job; and Joseph Stein's Broadway interpretation Fiddler on the Roof, based on the Tevye the Dairyman stories by Sholem Aleichem. Neil Simon wrote God's Favorite, which is a modern retelling of the Book of Job. Breughel and Georges de La Tour depicted Job visited by his wife. William Blake produced an entire cycle of illustrations for the book. It was adapted for Australian radio in 1939.

Strong parallels between the Book of Job and the novel The Trial by Franz Kafka have been pointed out by many people. Some scholars think Kafka deliberately based The Trial on the Book of Job.

Archibald MacLeish's drama JB, one of the most prominent uses of the Book of Job in modern literature, was awarded the Pulitzer Prize in 1959. Verses from the Book of Job 3:14 figure prominently in the plot of the film Mission: Impossible (1996). Job's influence can also be seen in the Coen brothers' 2009 film, A Serious Man, which was nominated for two Academy Awards.

Terrence Malick's 2011 film The Tree of Life, which won the Palme d'Or, is heavily influenced by the themes of the Book of Job, with the film starting with a quote from the beginning of God's speech to Job.

The Russian film Leviathan also draws themes from the Book of Job.

The 2014 Indian Malayalam-language action-drama film Iyobinte Pusthakam (lit. 'Book of Job') by Amal Neerad tells the story of a rich landowner named Iyob (the Malayalam equivalent of Job) and his relationship with his 3 sons during the late 1940s. The plot and characters of the film were inspired by King Lear and the Brothers Karamazov as well the Book of Job itself.

"The Sire of Sorrow (Job's Sad Song)" is the final track on Joni Mitchell's 15th studio album, Turbulent Indigo.

In 2015 two Ukrainian composers Roman Grygoriv and Illia Razumeiko created the opera-requiem IYOV. The premiere of the opera was held on 21 September 2015 on the main stage of the international multidisciplinary festival Gogolfest.

In the 3rd episode of the 15th season of ER, the lines of Job 3:23 are quoted by doctor Abby Lockhart shortly before she and her husband (Dr. Luka Covac) leave the series forever.

In season two of Good Omens, the tale of Job and his struggles with good and evil are demonstrated and debated as the demon Crowley is sent to plague Job and his family by destroying his property and children, and the angel Aziraphale struggles with the implications of the actions of God.

In the South Park episode "Cartmanland", Kyle Broflovski, who is Jewish, experiences a major crisis of faith. His parents try to cheer him up by reading from the Book of Job, which only serves to demoralize Kyle even more, who despairs at Job's horrific trials by God to prove a point to Satan.

In a series of (now deleted) cryptic tweets detailing the story of an unconfirmed meeting with Bob Dylan, comedian Norm Macdonald makes allusions and references to the Book of Job, calling it his favorite book of the Bible. Dylan allegedly preferred Ecclesiastes.

=== In Islam and Arab folk tradition ===
Job (Arabic: ايوب, romanized: Ayyub) is one of the 25 prophets mentioned by name in the Quran, where he is lauded as a steadfast and upright worshipper (Q.38:44). His story has the same basic outline as in the Bible, although the three friends are replaced by his brothers, and his wife stays by his side.

In Lebanon the Muwahideen (or Druze) community have a shrine built in the Shouf area that allegedly contains Job's tomb. In Turkey, Job is known as Eyüp, and he is supposed to have lived in Şanlıurfa. There is also a tomb of Job outside the city of Salalah in Oman.

== See also ==
- Answer to Job by Carl Jung
- Book of Job in Byzantine illuminated manuscripts
- Moralia in Job
- Ludlul bēl nēmeqi, the "Babylonian Job"
- Testament of Job
- God's Favorite, a play by Neil Simon, loosely based on the Book of Job

== Notes ==
Book of Job Wisdom literature
Preceded by Proverbs	Hebrew Bible	Succeeded by Song of Songs
Preceded by Esther	Protestant; Old Testament	Succeeded by Psalms
Preceded by 2 Maccabees	Roman Catholic; Old Testament	Succeeded by Psalms
Preceded by 3 Maccabees	Eastern Orthodox; Old Testament	Succeeded by Psalms
