= Elihu (biblical figure) =

Biblical figure associated with Job

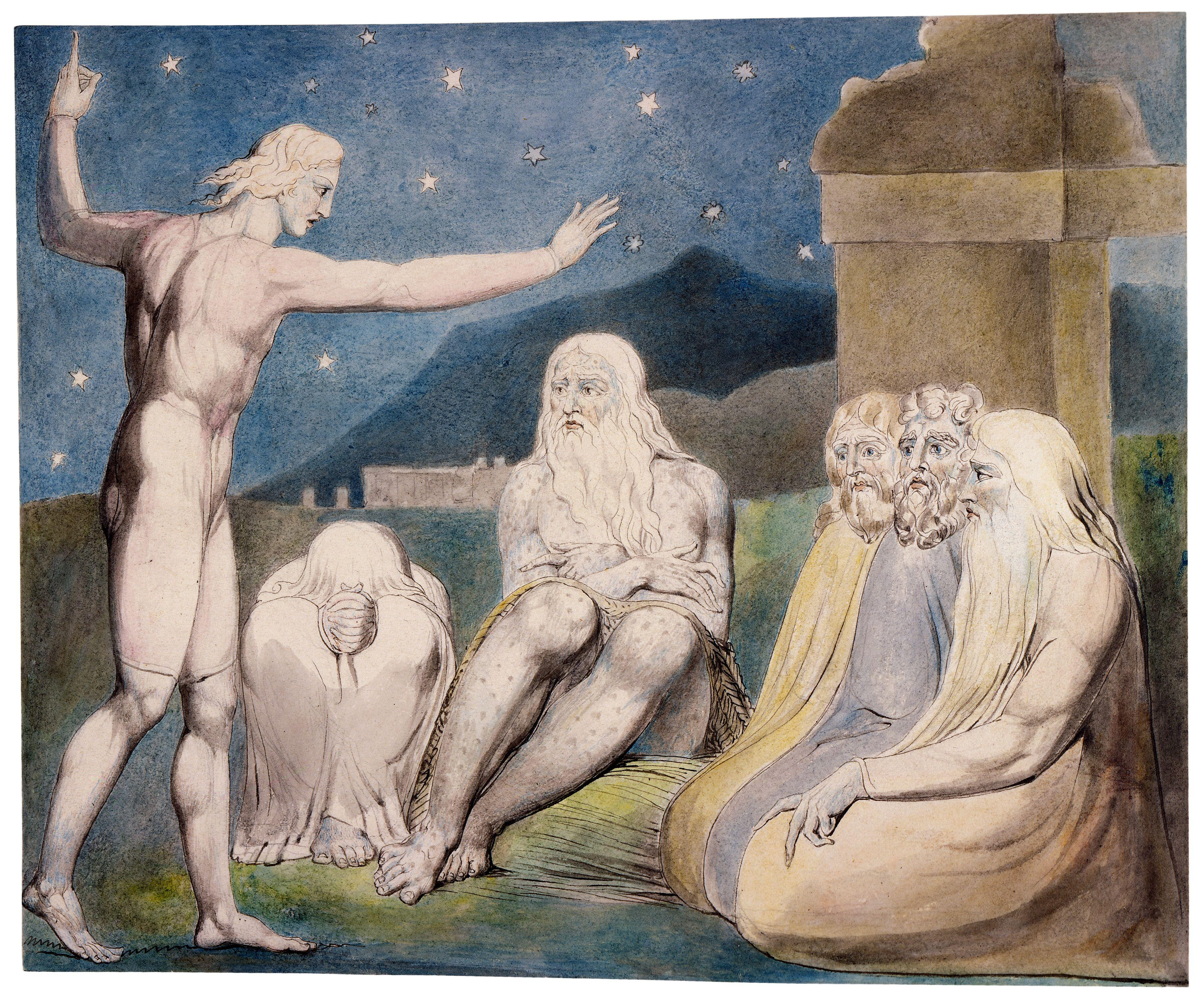
The Wrath of Elihu (1805) by William Blake; one of his series of illustrations of the Book of Job

Elihu (Hebrew: אֱלִיהוּא, romanized: ʾĔlîhûʾ, 'my God is he') is a critic of Job and his three friends in the Hebrew Bible's Book of Job. He is said to have been the son of Barachel and a descendant of Buz, who may have been from the line of Abraham (Genesis 22:20–21 mentions Buz as a nephew of Abraham).

== Elihu's monologues ==
Towards the end of the book, Elihu is introduced in Job 32:2. His speeches comprise chapters 32–37, and he opens his discourse with more modesty than displayed by the other comforters. Elihu addresses Job by name (Job 33:1, 33:31, 37:14), and his words differ from those of the three friends in that his monologues discuss divine providence, which he insists is full of wisdom and mercy.

The narrator's preface Job 32:4–5 and Elihu's own words in Job 32:11 indicate that he has been listening intently to the conversation between Job and the other three men. He also admits his non-elder status (32:6–7). As Elihu's monologue reveals, his anger against the three older men was so strong he could not contain himself (32:2–4). An "angry young man", he is critical of both Job and his friends:

I have words for a reply to you and your friends as well.

Andrew B. Davidson argues that the "friends" (or companions) in this verse are not his three friends—Bildad, Eliphaz, and Zophar—but "most probably Job is considered here the centre of a circle of persons who cherished the same irreligious doubts in regard to God’s providence as he did".

Elihu claims that the righteous have their share of prosperity in this life no less than the wicked. He teaches that God is supreme and that one must acknowledge and submit to that supremacy because of God's wisdom. He draws instances of benignity from, for example, the constant wonders of creation and the seasons.

Elihu's speeches finish abruptly, and he disappears "without a trace" at the end of chapter 37.

== Possible pseudonymity of the character ==
The speeches of Elihu (who is not mentioned in the prologue) contradict the fundamental opinions expressed by the 'friendly accusers' in the central body of the text, that it is impossible that the righteous should suffer, all pain being a punishment for some sin. Elihu states that suffering may be decreed for the righteous as a protection against greater sin, for moral betterment and warning, and to elicit greater trust and dependence on a merciful, compassionate God in the midst of adversity.

Some writers question the status of Elihu's interruption and didactic sermon because of his sudden appearance and disappearance from the text. Even scholars who regard the Book of Job as a literary composition by a single author tend to see in Elihu's speeches an early addition or commentary to the original book. He is not mentioned in Job 2:11, in which Job's friends are introduced, nor is he mentioned at all in the epilogue, 42:7–10, in which God expresses anger at Job's friends. His speech contains more Aramaisms than the rest of the book.

== Theories about authorship ==
Early scholarship by figures such as Albert Barnes and John Lightfoot sometimes attributed authorship of the Book of Job to Elihu.

== See also ==
- Bildad
- Eliphaz
- Zophar
