= Ethiopic Apocalypse of Baruch =

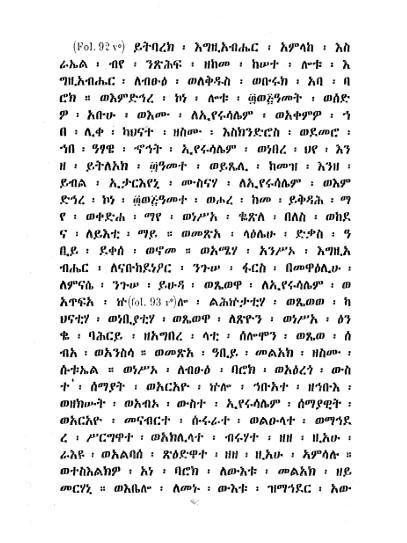
Halévy's transcription of the start of the Apocalypse

The Ethiopic Apocalypse of Baruch, also called the 5 Baruch, is an apocalypse written in Geʿez (Ethiopic) composed by Ethiopian Orthodox Christians that was revised and adopted by the Beta Israel (or Falasha) community.

== Textual history ==
Both halves of the Apocalypse appear to have been originally written in Ethiopic. Two versions of the text exist, the first being the original Christian composition and the second being a redacted Falasha edition for use by the Jewish Beta Israel community. As one of the few Christian Ethiopic texts to be revised into a Jewish version, the book provides useful insight into the redaction process. The writers of the Falasha Jewish text removed most Christian elements, replacing the doxology and mentions of Christ with references to a single God. Other changes include swapping "church" with "sanctuary", "Gospel" with "book", and the omission of a "bishop" role. However, the translators appear to have had an imperfect understanding of Geʿez and failed to remove other Christian allusions, such as references to cross veneration, Christian Roman emperors, Sunday worship, and the Holy Spirit.

The first half of the text appears to draw strong influence from The Apocalypse of Gorgorios and the Ethiopic Apocalypse of the Virgin the latter of which adapted the Apocalypse of Paul and, by extension, the Apocalypse of Peter. The second half appears to be an abridged adaptation of the Ethiopic Apocalypse of Peter, the Apocalypse of Thomas, and others, and it must have been composed after 550 A.D., following the reign of Gabra Masqal, whom the apocalypse references.

5 Baruch was one of the texts included in J. Halevy's collection when he published a volume titled Te'ezaza Sanbat featuring both original Ethiopic transcript and a French translation. But because the volume was misleadingly named after only one of the texts it contained, the volume's other texts were neglected until A. Z. Aescoli rediscovered the text.

== Synopsis ==
The Apocalypse has two clear parts. The first, the larger half, is an account set in the past after the first destruction of Jerusalem. While he is serving as doorkeeper in Jerusalem, Baruch prays that he may not witness Jerusalem's destruction. At the age of seventy, on the eve of Jerusalem's destruction, he falls into a deep slumber is led by the angel Sutu'el to the New Jerusalem and its component cities. There the angel shows him a dwelling place for the martyrs, a column inscribed with the names of the righteous from the beginning of the world to the end, a gate with fruit through which married couples enter, a couch for those who have protected their virginity, a gate with a stream of oil for those who hate the old world, a stream of milk for those with a divine calling from birth, a city for righteous kings and governors, and a residence for the mighty who followed the Lord's commands.

As the angel explains the righteous qualities of the city's inhabitants, Baruch is led onto a golden ship and brought to a city named 'Aqraba,' or the “Land of the Living.” Here he witnesses Enoch and Elijah writing down the works of the righteous and a description is given of the holy new age that will come with the advent of the Holy Spirit. The angel continues the tour, showing him a stream of honey for the prophets, a stream of wine for the selfless and hospitable. Baruch is brought to the east and is further shown a column of gold with the names of the righteous, a city's gate where boastful and haughty hermits are kept out of reach of fruit and water, and a residential city for hermits who rejected earthly pleasures.

Baruch is then brought west and shown a column of fire with the names of sinners, a place of greedy virgins, a stream of fire for corrupt priests, a sea of fire for wicked priests and teachers, an abyss of fire for fornicators, a pit of fire for those who sinned in the sanctuary, a chasm of fire for those who had sex with their family, rocks of fire for those who worshipped stones, trees of fire for those who aborted babies, and a caldron of fire for wicked rulers. Sutu'el proclaims woes on wicked rulers but blessings on righteous ones. They continue on, seeing mountains of fire for wicked kings, a pit of fiery animals for hermits who did not keep their vows, burning sand where deacons who failed to promptly bring their offerings were made to run, burning ropes for priests who did not offer their sacrifices at the appointed times, cups of fire for priests with impure hearts, maimed people who practiced magic, tailors breathing fire for not using all of their thread, and cords of fire for those who broke their fasts.

Finally, Baruch's tour is brought to an end before Gehenna, which is sealed with seven seals. Sutu'el orders the angel of Gehenna to unseal the punishment and to reveal the horrors within.

In the second half of the book, Baruch is witness to future realities. As the age of the church dawns, people will act civilly with each other, and an age of prosperity will unfold under Helena, Constantine, Theodosius, and Gabra Masqal, only for a rapid decline following their rules. The situation will rebound in the thirty-year rule of a righteous man, but this will be short-lived. A succession of rulers is described, each of whom will reign for seven years: first the Antichrist, then the Lion, then the demon Qoleyon, then the Eagle, then the Winds. Finally, Michael will sound his trumpet three times. The dead will be raised and the righteous will be rewarded.

== Bibliography ==
- Charlesworth, James H. (1983). The Old Testament Pseudepigrapha: Apocalyptic Literature and Testaments, Volume 1. New Haven, Connecticut: Yale University Press. pp. 659–660. ISBN 978-0-300-14019-4.
- Halevy, Josephy (1902). Te'ezaza Sanbat. Librairie Émile Bouillon. pp. 80–96, 196–209.
- Leslau, Wolf (1951). Falasha Anthology. Yale University Press. pp. 58–77.
- Kaplan, Steven (1999). "The Literature of the Beta Israel (Falasha): A Survey of a Biblical-Hebraic Tradition". Христианский Восток [Xristianskij Vostok]. n.s. 1 (7): 111–112.
- Uhlig, Siegbert (2003). Encyclopaedia Aethiopica: A Reference Work on the Horn of Africa Vol. 1: A - C. Research Unit Ethiopian Studies. ISBN 978-3-447-04746-3.
