= Seder Olam =

Seder Olam (Hebrew: סדר עולם) is the name of two works of early rabbinical literature dealing largely with religious chronology. The two works are:

- Seder Olam Rabbah, the earlier and larger work
- Seder Olam Zutta, the smaller work
