= Seraiah ben Neriah =

Seriah ben Neriah was a Jewish aristocrat of the sixth century BCE. He was the son of Neriah and the brother of Baruch ben Neriah, the disciple of the biblical prophet Jeremiah.

Seriah served as chamberlain of King Zedekiah of Judah and was brought to Babylon with the king in the fourth year of his reign. As Seraiah was about to be led off, Jeremiah gave him a scroll to read in Babylon prophesying the empire’s destruction. Once he had done so, he was instructed to tie the scroll containing the prophecy to a stone and to hurl it into the Euphrates as a depiction of Babylon’s coming doom.

Nahman Avigad identified him as the owner of a seal with the name "to Seriahu/Neriyahu".
