= Baruch ben Neriah =

Biblical character, friend of prophet Jeremiah

Baruch
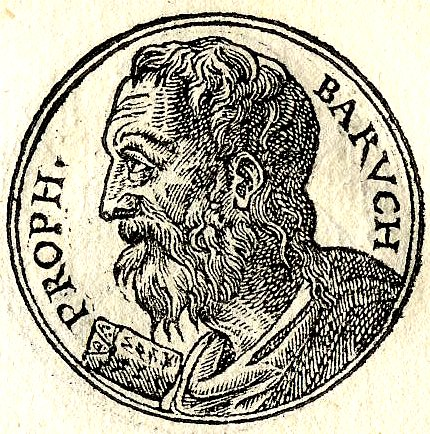
- Baruch ben Neria from the Promptuarii Iconum Insigniorum (1553).

Prophet, Righteous
- Honored in: Judaism; Catholic Church; Eastern Orthodox Church; Rastafari
- Feast: 28 September; 15 November
- Major works: Book of Baruch

Baruch ben Neriah (Hebrew: בָּרוּךְ בֶּן־נֵרִיָּה Bārūḵ ben Nērīyyā; c. 6th century BC) was the scribe, disciple, secretary, and devoted friend of the Biblical prophet Jeremiah. He is traditionally credited with authoring the Book of Baruch.

== Biography ==
According to Josephus, Baruch was a Jewish aristocrat, a son of Neriah and brother of Seraiah ben Neriah, chamberlain of King Zedekiah of Judah.

Baruch became the scribe of the prophet Jeremiah and wrote down the first and second editions of his prophecies as they were dictated to him. Baruch remained true to the teachings and ideals of the great prophet, although like his master he was at times almost overwhelmed with despondency. While Jeremiah was in hiding to avoid the wrath of King Jehoiakim, he commanded Baruch to read his prophecies of warning to the people gathered in the Temple in Jerusalem on a day of fasting. The task was both difficult and dangerous, but Baruch performed it without flinching and it was probably on this occasion that the prophet gave him the personal message (Jeremiah 45).

Both Baruch and Jeremiah witnessed the Babylonian siege of Jerusalem of 587–586 BC. In the middle of the siege of Jerusalem, Jeremiah purchased an estate in Anathoth on which the Babylonian armies had encamped (as a symbol of faith in the eventual restoration of Jerusalem; Jeremiah 32) and, according to Josephus, Baruch continued to reside with him at Mizpah.

He was carried with Jeremiah to Egypt, where, according to a tradition preserved by Jerome, he soon died. Two other traditions state that he later went, or was carried, to Babylon by Nebuchadnezzar II after the latter's conquest of Egypt.

Baruch's prominence, by reason of his intimate association with Jeremiah, led later generations to exalt his reputation still further. To him were attributed the Book of Baruch and two other Jewish books. (Note: See Apocalypse of Baruch)

== Historicity ==
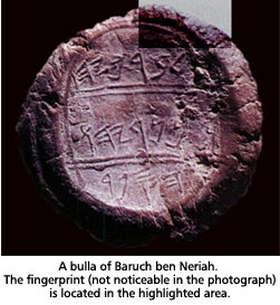

In 1975, a clay bulla purportedly containing Baruch's seal and name appeared on the antiquities market. Its purchaser, a prominent Israeli collector, permitted Israeli archaeologist Nahman Avigad to publish the bulla. Although its source is not definitively known, it has been identified as coming from the "burnt house" excavated by Yigal Shiloh. The bulla is now in the Israel Museum. It measures 17 by 16 millimetres (0.67 by 0.63 in), and is stamped with an oval seal, 13 by 11 millimetres (0.51 by 0.43 in). The inscription, written in the ancient Hebrew alphabet, reads:

Line	Transliteration	Translation
1	lbrkyhw	[belonging] to Berachyahu
2	bn nryhw	son of Neriyahu
3	hspr	the scribe

In 1996, a second clay bulla emerged with an identical inscription; presumably stamped with the same seal. This bulla also was imprinted with a fingerprint; Hershel Shanks, among others, speculated that the fingerprint might be that of Baruch himself; the authenticity of these bullae however has been disputed.^{ibid.}And they are now considered a forgery by most scholars.

=== Scholarly theories ===
In the second edition of Richard Elliott Friedman's book Who Wrote the Bible?, in which he defended the documentary hypothesis, he put forward the claim that the Deuteronomist, who is generally thought to have either written or edited the books from Deuteronomy to II Kings, was Baruch ben Neriah. He defended this assertion by comparing a number of different phrases in the Book of Jeremiah with phrases in other books. Some reject this claim on the grounds that it goes beyond the evidence.

== Religious traditions ==
=== Rabbinical literature ===
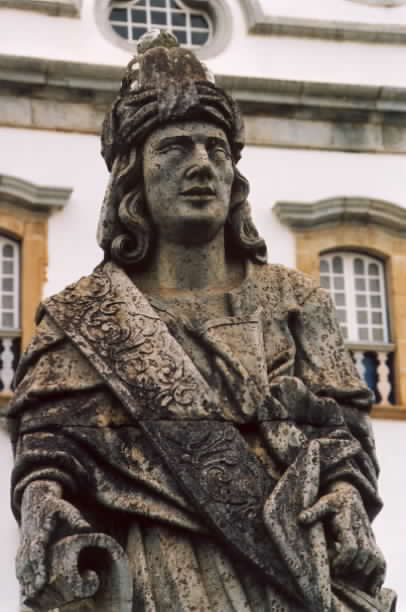
Statue of Baruch by Aleijadinho

The rabbis described Baruch as a faithful helper and blood-relative of Jeremiah. According to rabbinic literature, both Baruch and Jeremiah, being kohanim and descendants of the proselyte Rahab, served as a humiliating example to their contemporaries, inasmuch as they belong to the few who harkened to the word of God. A Midrash in the Sifre regarded Baruch as identical with the Ethiopian Ebed-melech, who rescued Jeremiah from the dungeon, and states that he received his appellation Baruch ("blessed") because of his piety, which contrasted with the loose life of the court, as the skin of an Ethiopian contrasts with that of a white person. According to a Syriac account, because his piety might have prevented the destruction of the Temple, God commanded him to leave Jerusalem before the catastrophe, so as to remove his protective presence. According to the account, Baruch then saw, from Abraham's oak at Hebron, the Temple set on fire by angels, who previously had hidden the sacred vessels.

The Tannaim are much divided on the question whether Baruch is to be classed among the Prophets. According to Mekhilta, Baruch complained because the gift of prophecy had not been given to him. "Why," he said, "is my fate different from that of all the other disciples of the Prophets? Joshua served Moses, and the Holy Spirit rested upon him; Elisha served Elijah, and the Holy Spirit rested upon him. Why is it otherwise with me?" God answered him: "Baruch, of what avail is a hedge where there is no vineyard, or a shepherd where there are no sheep?" Baruch, therefore, found consolation in the fact that when Israel was exiled to Babylonia there was no longer occasion for prophecy.

The Seder Olam (xx.), however, and the Talmud, include Baruch among the Prophets, and state that he prophesied in the period following the destruction. It was in Babylonia also that Ezra studied the Torah with Baruch. Nor did he think of returning to Judea during his teacher's lifetime, since he considered the study of the Torah more important than the rebuilding of the Temple; and Baruch could not join the returning exiles by reason of his age.

=== Christian traditions ===
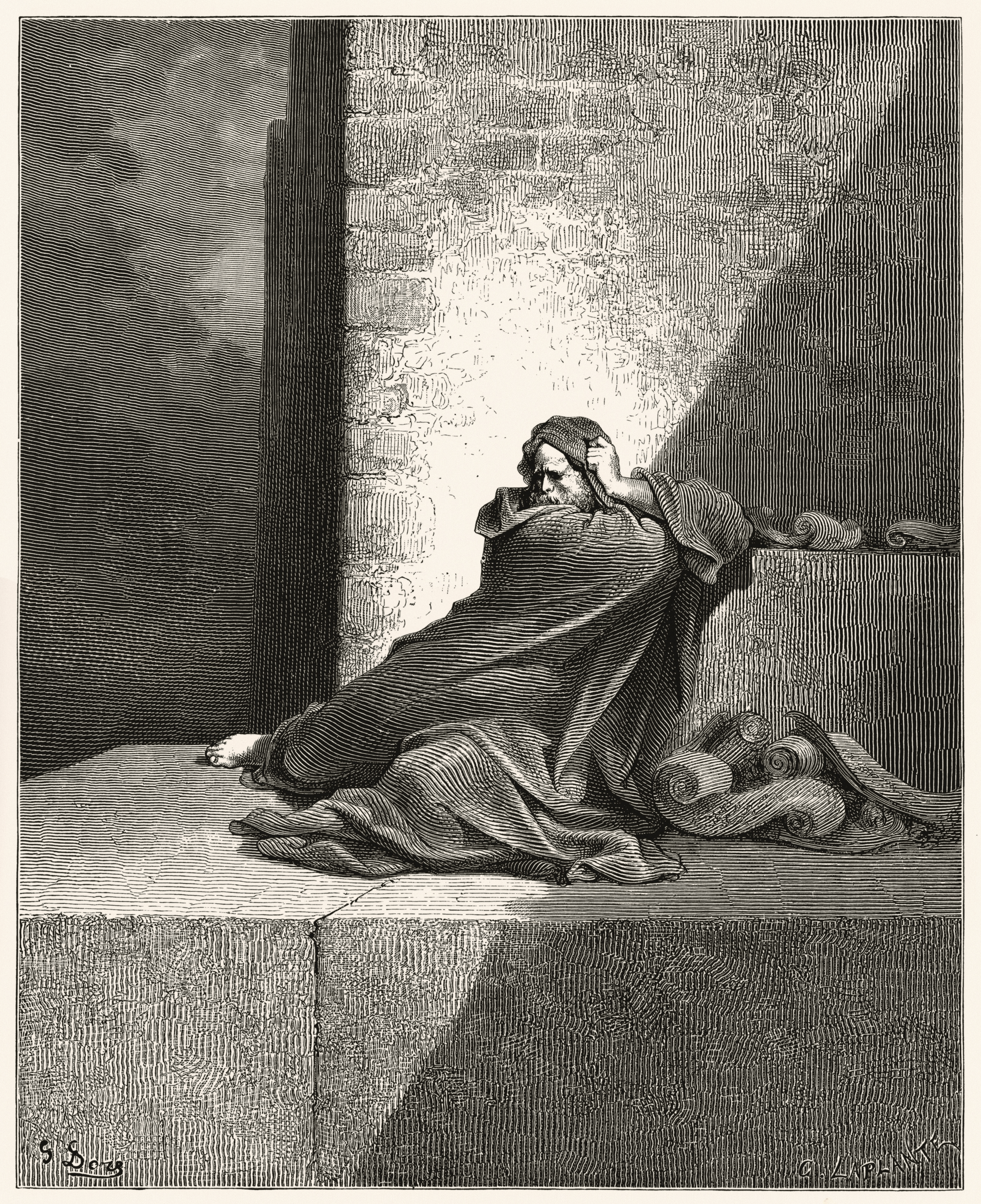
An image of Baruch from Gustave Doré's illustrations for La Grande Bible de Tours.

Some Christian legends (especially from Syria and Arabia) identify Baruch with Zoroaster, and give much information concerning him. Baruch, angry because the gift of prophecy had been denied him, and on account of the destruction of Jerusalem and the Temple, left Israel to found the religion of Zoroaster. The prophecy of the Virgin birth of Jesus, and of the Adoration of the Magi, is also ascribed to Baruch-Zoroaster. (Note: Compare the complete collection of these legends in Gottheil 1894, pp. 24–51 and Jackson 1899, pp. 17, 165-) It is difficult to explain the origin of this curious identification of a prophet with a magician, such as Zoroaster was held to be, among the Jews, Christians, and Arabs. De Sacy explains it on the ground that in Arabic the name of the prophet Jeremiah is almost identical with that of the city of Urmiah, where, it is said, Zoroaster lived.

However, this may be, the Jewish legend mentioned above (under Baruch in Rabbinical Literature), according to which the Ethiopian in Jeremiah 38:7 is undoubtedly identical with Baruch, is connected with this Arabic–Christian legend. In the Clementine Recognitions Zoroaster was believed to be a descendant of Ham; and, according to Genesis 10:6, Cush, the Ethiopian, is a son of Ham. According to the "Recognitions", the Persians believed that Zoroaster had been taken into heaven in a chariot ("ad cœlum vehiculo sublevatum"); and according to the Jewish legend, the above-mentioned Ethiopian was transported alive into paradise, an occurrence that, like the translation of Elijah, must have taken place by means of a "vehiculum." Another reminiscence of the Jewish legend is found in Baruch-Zoroaster's words concerning Jesus: "He shall descend from my family", since, according to the Haggadah, Baruch was a priest; and Maria, the mother of Jesus, was of priestly family.

In the Eastern Orthodox Church Baruch is venerated as a saint, and as such is commemorated on September 28 (which, for those who follow the traditional Julian Calendar, falls on October 11 of the Gregorian Calendar).

The Catholic Church considers Baruch as a Saint along with other biblical prophets, his feast days are 28 September and 15 November.

Some sources set a date for his commemoration on 21 October.

== Tomb of Baruch ==
The tomb of Baruch is unknown. It is reported to be a mile away from that of Ezekiel, near a town known Mashhad Ali; however there is no record of it existing. Rabbinic sources reported that a strange plant, the leaves of which are sprinkled with gold dust, grows on it.

According to the Syriac Apocalypse of Baruch, he was translated to paradise in his mortal body. The tomb is said to have been miraculous as well, and was supposedly a place for Jewish pilgrimage.

However, there is a tomb within the Al-Nukhailah Mosque in Al-Kifl dedicated to Baruch. Corresponding with the earlier legend, it is located near to the Tomb of Ezekiel, which is also in the same building.

== See also ==
- List of biblical figures identified in extra-biblical sources
