= William Blake's Illustrations of the Book of Job =

Engraved prints by William Blake

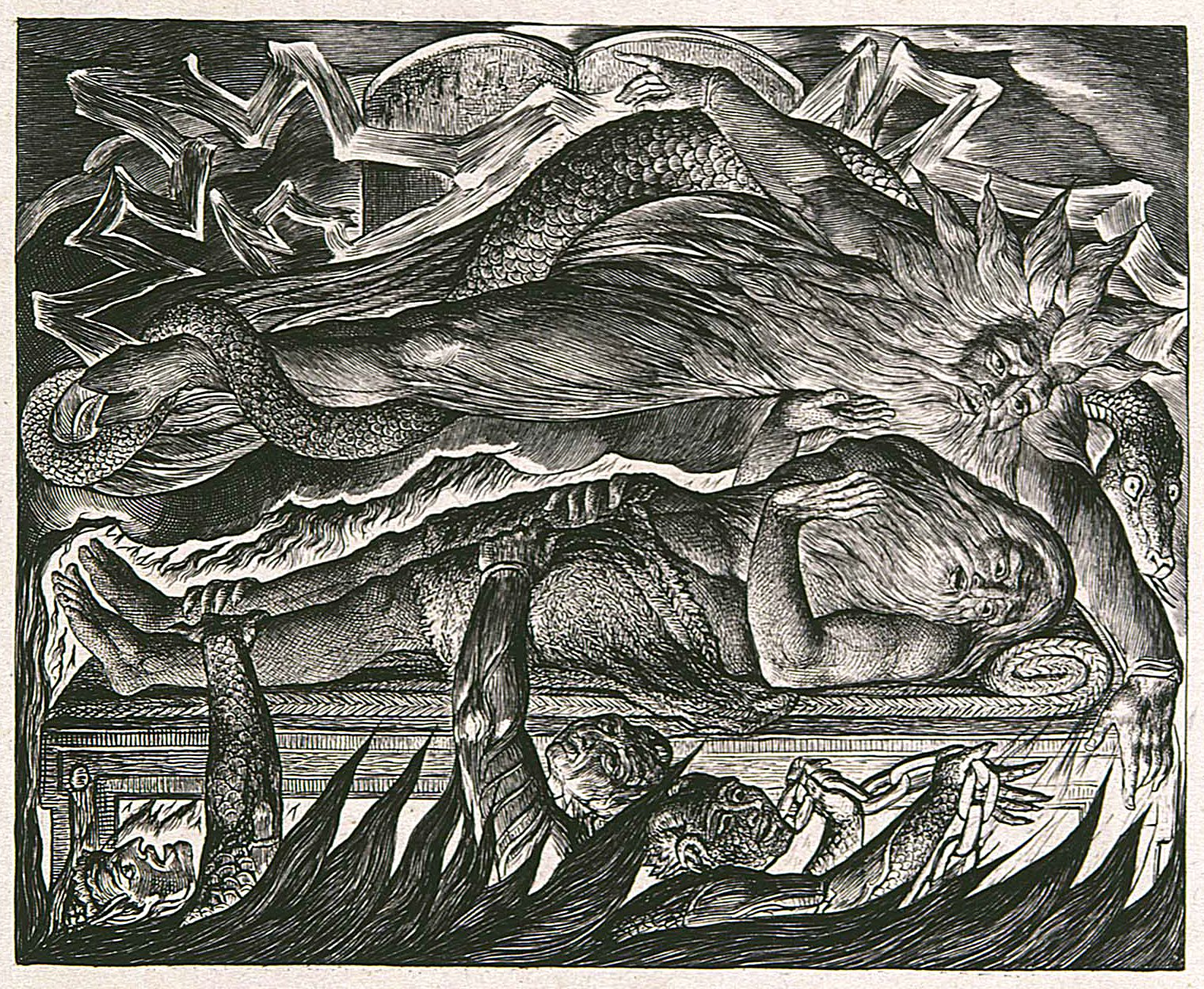
Plate 11 of the engravings, detail of centre image.

William Blake's Illustrations of the Book of Job primarily refers to a series of twenty-two engraved prints (published 1826) by Blake illustrating the biblical Book of Job. It also refers to two earlier sets of watercolours by Blake on the same subject (1806 and 1821). The engraved Illustrations are considered to be Blake's greatest masterpieces in the medium of engraving, and were also a rare commercial and critical success for Blake.

== Development and printing history ==
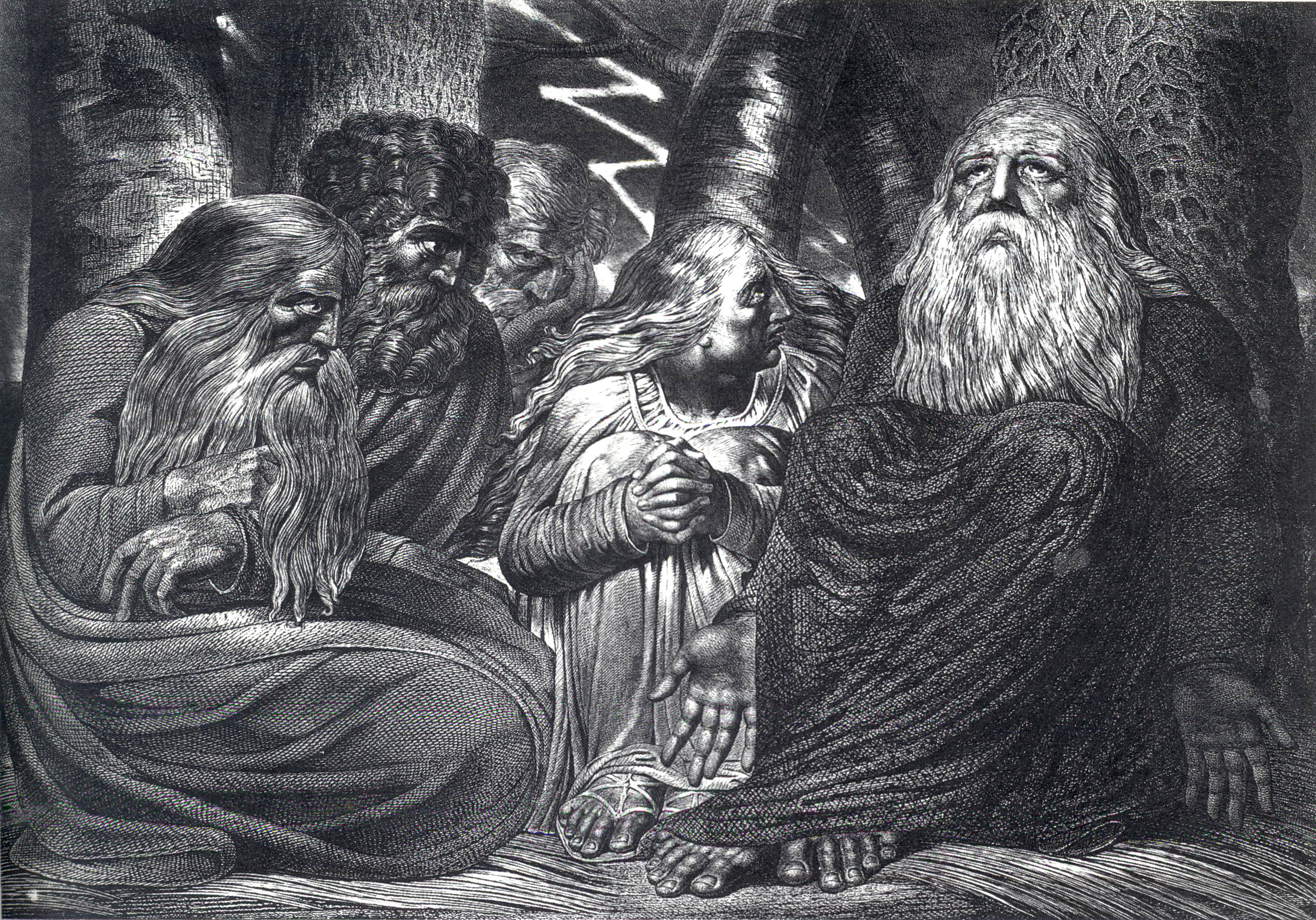
Blake's 1793 engraving for the Book of Job. This engraving, although not included in the 1826 Illustrations, most closely resembles the tenth illustration, Job Rebuked by his Friends.

=== Origins ===
As early as 1785 Blake had sketched several ink studies of an illustration to Job. In 1793 Blake engraved a composition based upon these drawings, which he offered for sale in the Prospectus to the Public for twelve shillings. This, alongside an engraving of Ezekiel, are the only extant examples of an intended series of biblical illustrations that were never completed. Blake reworked the Job plate sometime after 1804, but the resulting print was not included in the Illustrations.

Blake's next illustration was the tempera painting Job and his Daughters (1800), commissioned by Thomas Butts (see gallery below). This has similarities to plate 20 of the engraved illustrations, but it is unclear whether the print was directly based upon it.

=== The watercolours ===
The engraved illustrations to Job originated as a series of watercolours that Blake painted in 1805–06, also for Butts. These 19 watercolours are referred to as the Butts Set (in the collection of the Morgan Library & Museum).

A second set of watercolours, known as the Linell Set (mostly in the collection of the Fogg Art Museum) was produced in 1821 at the request of John Linell. Linell traced the watercolours from the "Butts set"; these tracings were then coloured in by Blake. As a result of this unusual process, the outlines of the Linell set are thicker and the colouring is uniformly darker, with a more restricted palette than the Butts set. Blake also added two new designs to the Linell set, and added copies of these to the Butts set. The two designs added were No.s 17 and 20, The Vision of Christ and Job and His Daughters.

There is also another set of watercolours known as the New Zealand Set. These were initially believed to be from Blake's hand, but their authenticity has been all but refuted by scholars such as Martin Butlin and Bo Lindberg. They are most likely copies after the engravings by someone in the circle of John Linell, as they have no unique features.

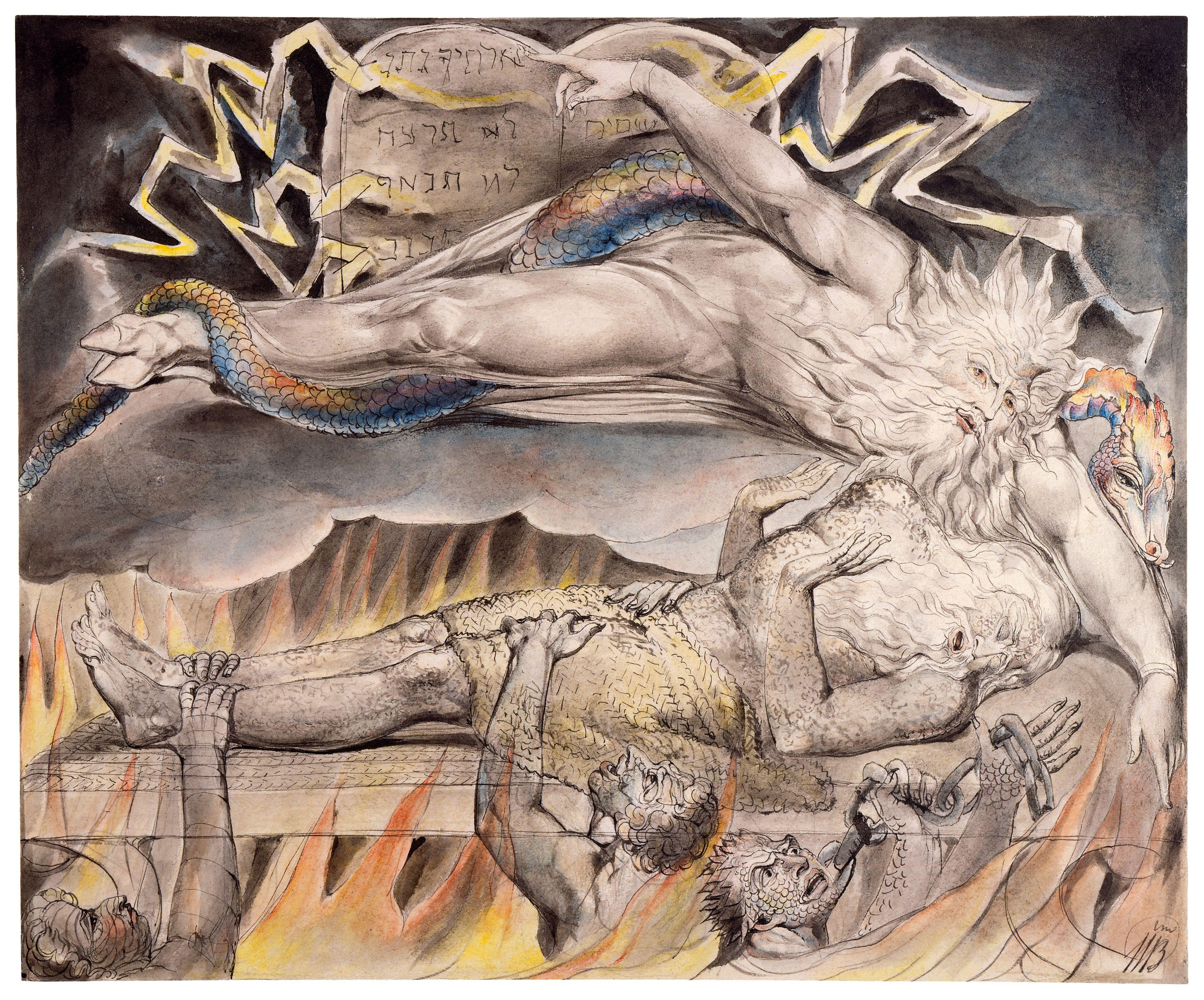
Job's Evil Dreams, from the Butts set, 1805–6.

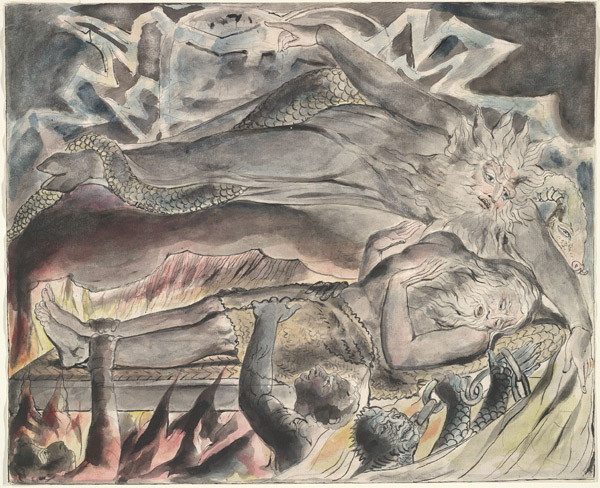
Job's Evil Dreams, from the Linell set, 1821.

=== The engravings ===
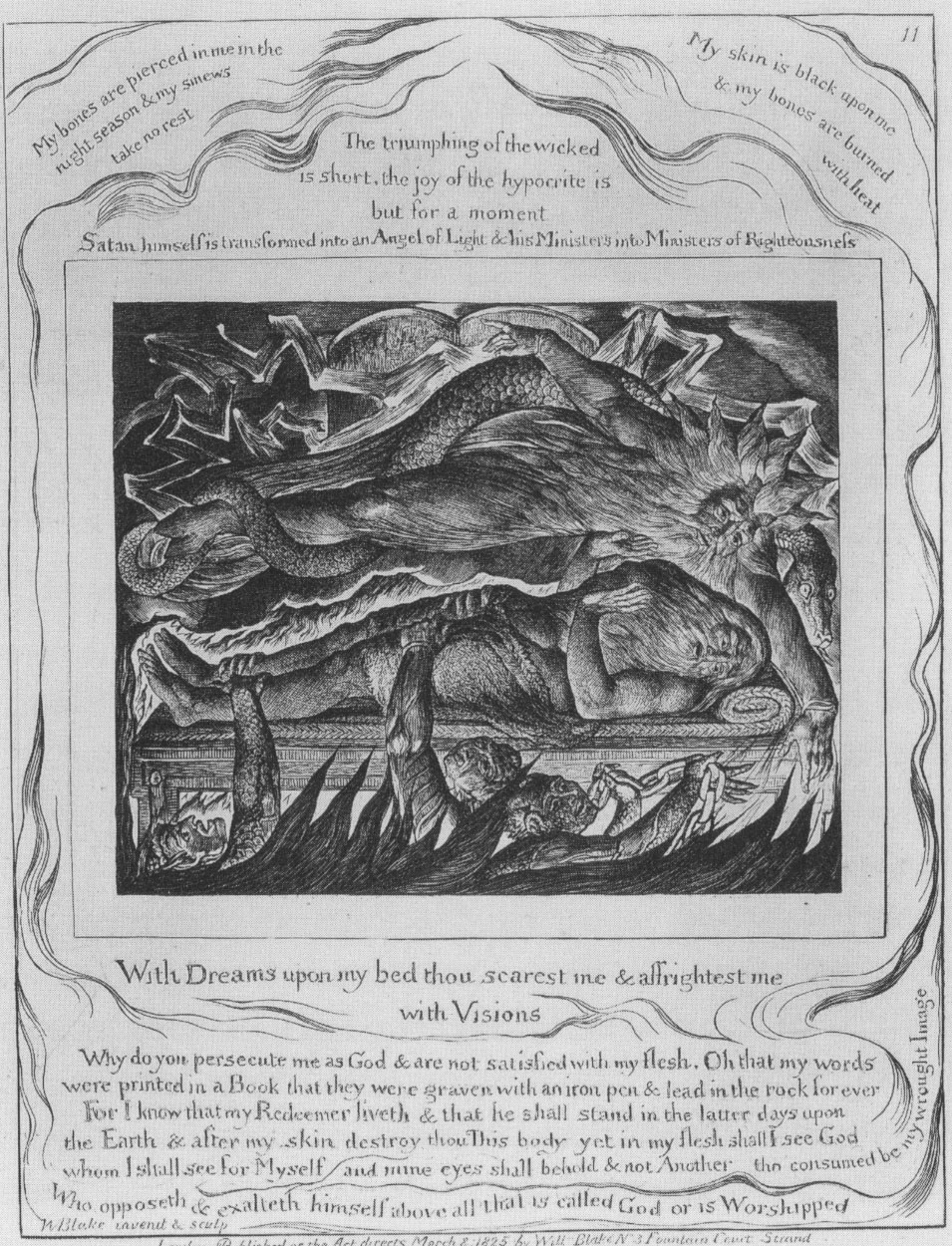
Plate 11, showing the marginal glosses. The line directly above the centre image reads: Satan himself is transformed into an Angel of Light & his Ministers into Ministers of Righteousness

In 1823 Linell formally commissioned Blake to engrave plates for printing. Unlike Blake's own productions in relief etching, this, like other commissioned work, was produced using the intaglio method of engraving. However, Blake rejected the "mixed method" popular among commercial reproductive engravers of his time. The "mixed method" entailed lightly etching guidelines into the plate. The image was then engraved by the dot and lozenge method and by stippling. Instead, Blake engraved his illustrations in pure line and without preliminary etching.

The engravings were completed in 1825, and an edition of 315 was produced in 1826. These were the last set of illustrations that Blake would complete. His illustrations of Dante's Divine Comedy were left unfinished upon his death.

The completed engravings differ from Blake's original watercolours mainly in the complex marginal designs that they employ. These comment upon the text with biblical quotes and paraphrases, and also contain images that reinforce the themes of the main illustrations.

After completing the engravings, Blake painted an additional tempera of Satan Smiting Job with Boils in 1826.

== Analysis ==
The Book of Job was an important influence upon Blake's writings and art; Blake apparently identified with Job, as he spent his lifetime unrecognized and impoverished. Harold Bloom has interpreted Blake's most famous lyric, The Tyger, as a revision of God's rhetorical questions in the Book of Job concerning Behemoth and Leviathan. Blake also depicted the story of Job throughout his career as an artist. The song of Enion in Night the Second of The Four Zoas also demonstrates that Blake identified with Job.

=== Symbolism ===
Blake used symbols extensively in the illustrations; most notable is the use of right and left limbs in the figures. The right limb represents the spiritual and the good; the left, the material and evil. In plate six, Satan smites Job with boils using his left hand, and in plate 15 God indicates Behemoth and Leviathan with his left hand. Contrarily, God banishes Satan with his right hand in plate sixteen and speaks to Job from the whirlwind in plate fourteen with his right foot extended forward. Some scholars, however, have asserted that this systematic interpretation fails to account for inconsistencies in such symbolism and is excessively subjective.

The Hebrew incorporated in the Butts watercolor Job's Evil Dreams and in the engravings title plate and plate numbered 2 Hast thou considered my Servant Job is analyzed in 'Blake's Hebrew Calligraphy.'

The theme of an Orthodox Jewish ritual used in the composition of plate numbered 17 I have heard thee with the hearing of the Ear but now my Eye seeth thee is explained in 'Blake's Priestly Blessing: God Blesses Job.'

=== Artistic influences ===
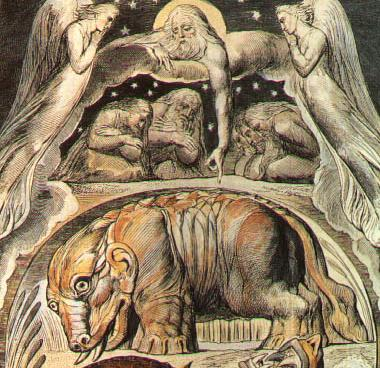
Detail of watercolour illustrating Behemoth and Leviathan, upon which plate 15 of the engravings was based.

From early in his artistic career, Blake collected the prints of Albrecht Dürer. The depiction of Behemoth in plate 15 of the engravings is believed to have been influenced by Dürer's Rhinoceros.

In his Public Address (possibly from 1810), Blake also indicates "Marc Antonio" (Marcantonio Raimondi), as an artist who inspired his linear technique of engraving. "Julio Romano" (Giulio Romano), Raphael, and Michelangelo are also mentioned by Blake in this address.

== Critical reception and legacy ==
Of the edition of 315, only 20 copies of the illustrations were sold in Blake's lifetime, mostly to people within Blake's immediate circle (such as Samuel Palmer). However, the Illustrations brought Blake an unprecedented degree of recognition. The Royal Academy and the King's Library each bought a copy; the former also awarded Blake £25. Such notables as John Constable and Lady Caroline Lamb invited him to dine, and the collector Charles Alders introduced him to Samuel Taylor Coleridge. The Illustrations also gained critical acknowledgment after Blake's death more quickly than his prophetic books. As early as 1857 John Ruskin wrote of Blake in The Elements of Drawing that

The Book of Job, engraved by himself, is of the highest rank in certain characters of imagination and expression; in the mode of obtaining certain effects of light it will also prove a very useful example to you. In expressing conditions of glaring and flickering light, Blake is greater than Rembrandt.

The triple-mirror design in the background of plate 20, Job and his Daughters, is believed to have influenced William Holman Hunt's use of the same motif in his painting The Lady of Shalott; Blake was highly regarded by the Pre-Raphaelites.

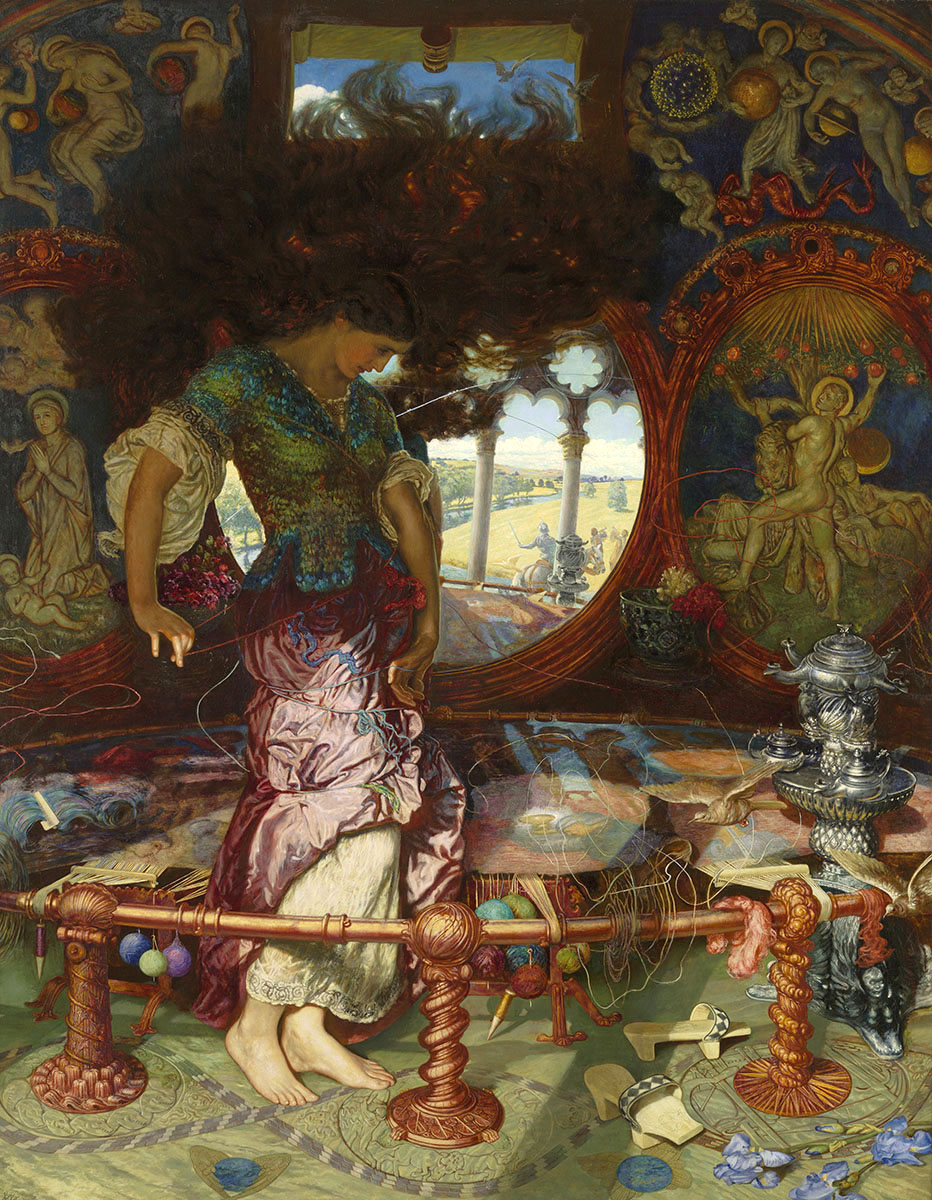
The Lady of Shalott, 1905.

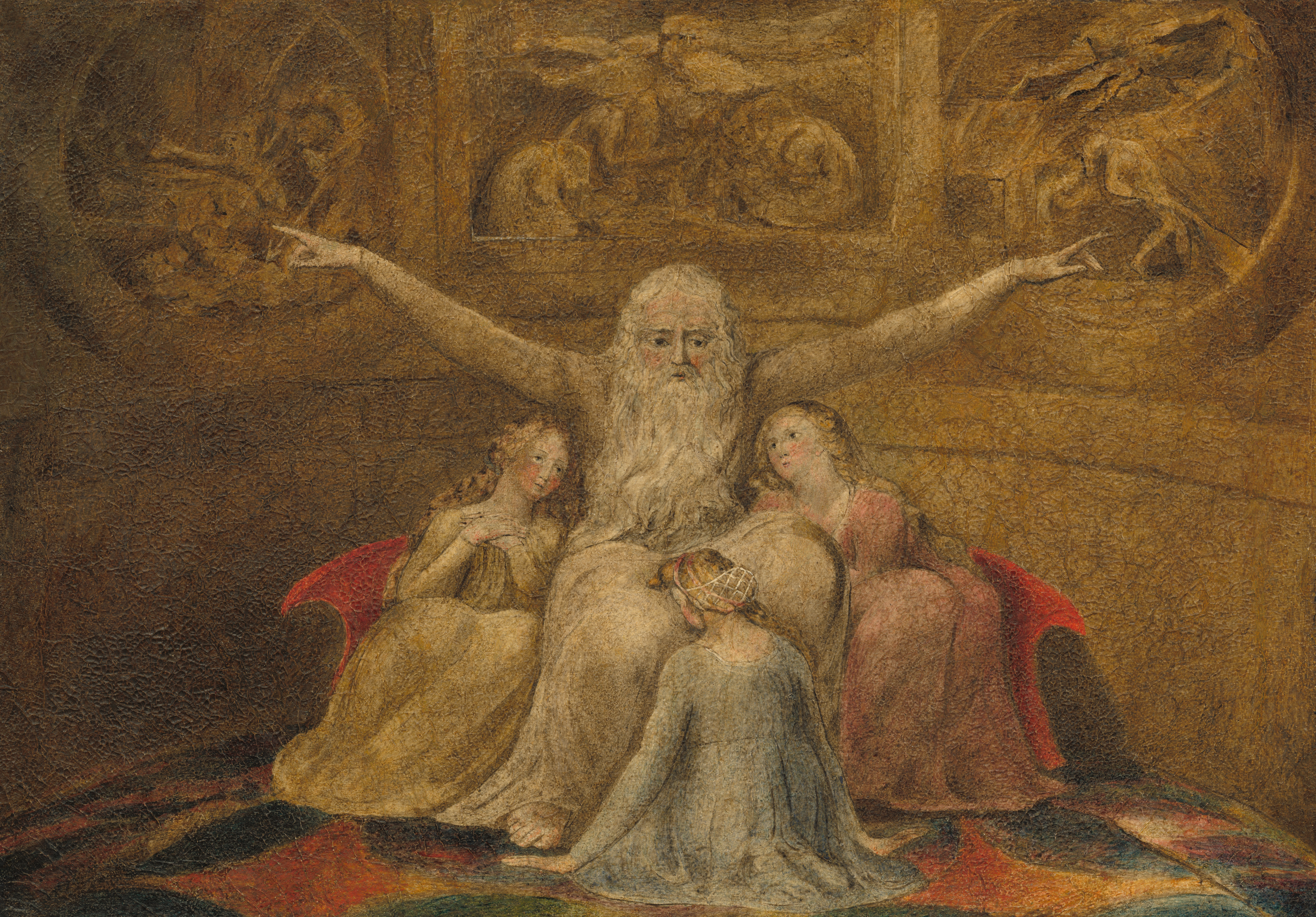
Job and His Daughters, 1800.

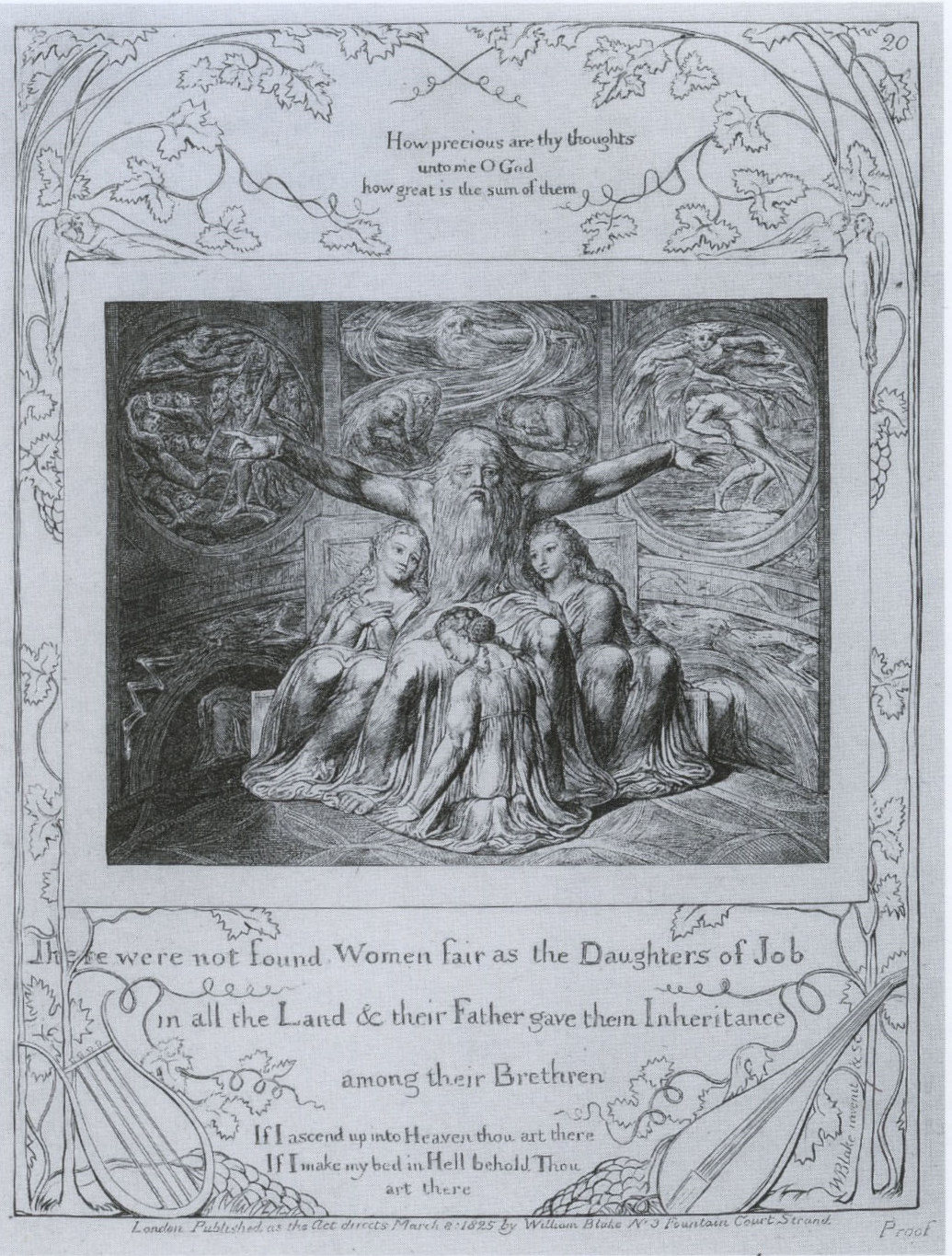
Plate 20 of the engravings.

=== Music ===
Ralph Vaughan Williams based his 1931 ballet Job: A Masque for Dancing upon the Illustrations.

In 1991 Dmitri Smirnov wrote a set of 4 études for clarinet and narrator called "Job's Studies", using plates 1, 3, 8 and 13 and citing Job 1:1-2, 1:16, 3:3 and 38:1-2 (differing from the verses Blake paraphrased with two of these plates).

== Table of Illustrations ==
Blake did not give titles to the illustrations and the most prominent text in the margins is used by some scholars (such as S. Foster Damon) as a title for a given illustration. Others, such as Robert Essick, use descriptive titles. Therefore, both are given here. In some cases the titles are the same.

Note that Blake's marginal texts are paraphrases of biblical passages and so will not be exactly identical to the linked verse.

Butts set	Linell set	Engraving	Descriptive title	Textual title with corresponding chapter and verse	Related works by Blake
NA	NA		Title Page	NA	
			Job and His Family	Thus did Job continually Job 1:5	
			Satan Before the Throne of God	When the Almighty was yet with me, When my Children were about me (Job 29:5)	A sketch by Blake in his notebook, in what would be later known as the Rossetti Manuscript
			Job's Sons and Daughters Overwhelmed by Satan	Thy Sons & thy Daughters were eating & drinking Wine in their eldest Brothers house & behold there came a great wind from the Wilderness & smote upon the four faces of the house & it fell upon the young Men & they are Dead (based upon Job 1:18–1:19)	
			The Messengers Tell Job of His Misfortunes	And I only am escaped alone to tell thee. (Job 1:15)	
			Satan Going Forth from the Presence of the Lord and Job's Charity	Then went Satan forth from the presence of the Lord (based upon Job 2:7)	
			Satan Smiting Job with Boils	And smote Job with sore Boils from the sole of his foot to the crown of his head (based upon Job 2:7)	Tempera painting, c. 1826-7
			Job's Comforters	And when they lifted up their eyes afar off & knew him not they lifted up their voice & wept, and rent every Man his mantle & sprinkled dust upon their heads towards heaven (Job 2:12)	
			Job's Despair	Let the Day perish wherin I was Born (Based upon Job 3:3)	
			The Vision of Eliphaz	Then a Spirit passed before my face the hair of my flesh stood up (Job 4:14)	
			Job Rebuked by His Friends	The Just Upright Man is laughed to scorn (Job 12:4)	Engraving c. 1793
			Job's Evil Dreams	With Dreams upon my bed thou scarest me & affrightest me with Visions (Job 7:14)	
			The Wrath of Elihu	I am Young & ye are very Old wherefore I was afraid (Job 32:6)	
			The Lord Answering Job out of the Whirlwind	Then the Lord answered Job out of the Whirlwind (Job 38:1)	Watercolor for Butts c. 1805
			When the Morning Stars Sang Together	When the morning Stars sang together, & all the Sons of God shouted for joy (Job 38:7)	
			Behemoth and Leviathan	Behold now Behemoth which I made with thee (Job 40:15)	
			The Fall of Satan	Thou hast fulfilled the Judgment of the Wicked (Job 36:17)	
			The Vision of Christ	I have heard thee with the hearing of the Ear but now my Eye seeth thee (Job 42:5)	
			Job's Sacrifice	And my Servant Job shall pray for you (Job 42:8)	
			Every one also gave him a piece of Money	Every one also gave him a piece of Money (Job 42:11)	
			Job and His Daughters	There were not found Women as fair as the Daughters of Job in all the Land & their Father gave them Inheritance among their Brethren (Job 42:15)	Tempera painting c. 1800
			Job and His Family Restored to Prosperity	So the Lord blessed the latter end of Job more than the beginning (Job 42:12)	

== See also ==
- Book of Job in Byzantine illuminated manuscripts
