= Bildad =

Biblical figure, an associate of Job

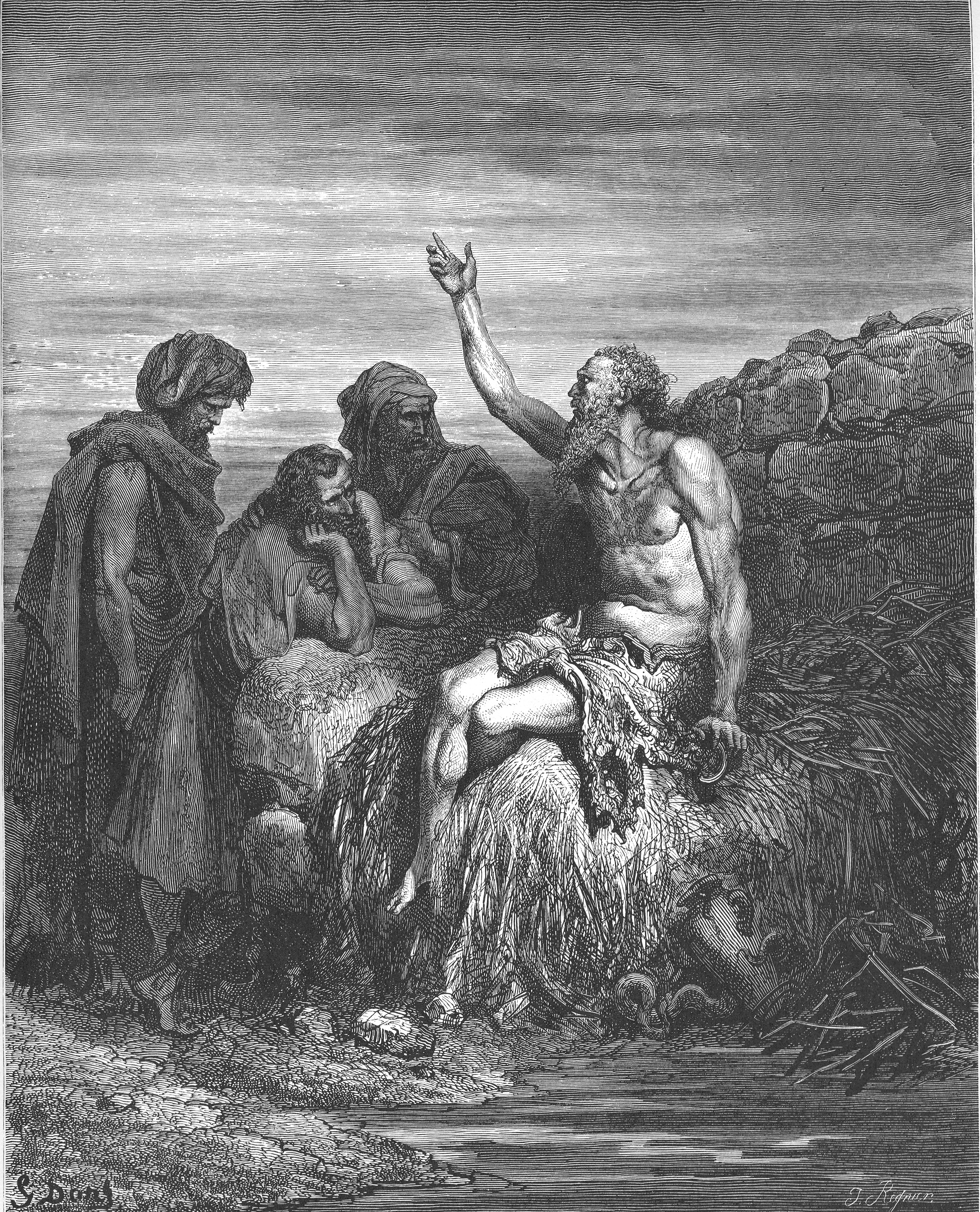
Gustave Doré, Job Speaks with His Friends.

Bildad (Biblical Hebrew: בִּלְדַּד, romanized: Bīldaḏ; (Note: The etymology of the name 'Bildad' is unclear) Ancient Greek: Βαλδάδ, romanized: Baldád), the Shuhite, was one of Job's three friends who visited the patriarch in the Hebrew Bible's Book of Job. He was a descendant of Shuah, son of Abraham and Keturah (Genesis 25:1–2), whose family lived in the deserts of Arabia, or a resident of the district. In speaking with Job, his intent was consolation, but he became an accuser, asking Job what he has done to deserve God's wrath.

== Speeches ==
The three speeches of Bildad are contained in Job 8, Job 18 and Job 25. In substance, Bildad largely echos what Eliphaz the Temanite had claimed. Bildad's speech is charged with somewhat increased vehemence, compared to Eliphaz who spoke first, because Bildad found Job's words too angry and impious. He was the first of Job's friends to attribute Job's calamity to actual wickedness; however, he does so indirectly, by accusing Job's children (who were destroyed in the opening scenes, Job 1:19) of sin to warrant their punishment (Job 8:4).

Bildad's brief third speech, just five verses in length, marked the silencing of the friends.

== In popular culture ==
- Bildad the Shuhite appears in the Prime Video Series Good Omens, where the demon Crowley disguises himself as "one of the friends of Job" in a satirical retelling of the Book of Job.
- Captain Bildad is one of the owners of the Pequod in Herman Melville's Moby-Dick.
- Dr Grantly, archdeacon of Barchester in Anthony Trollope's novel Barchester Towers, is on occasion compared to "Bildad the Shuhite" (vol. II, ch. 44).

== See also ==
- Eliphaz
- Zophar
- Elihu
