= Eliphaz (Job) =

Biblical figure, an associate of Job

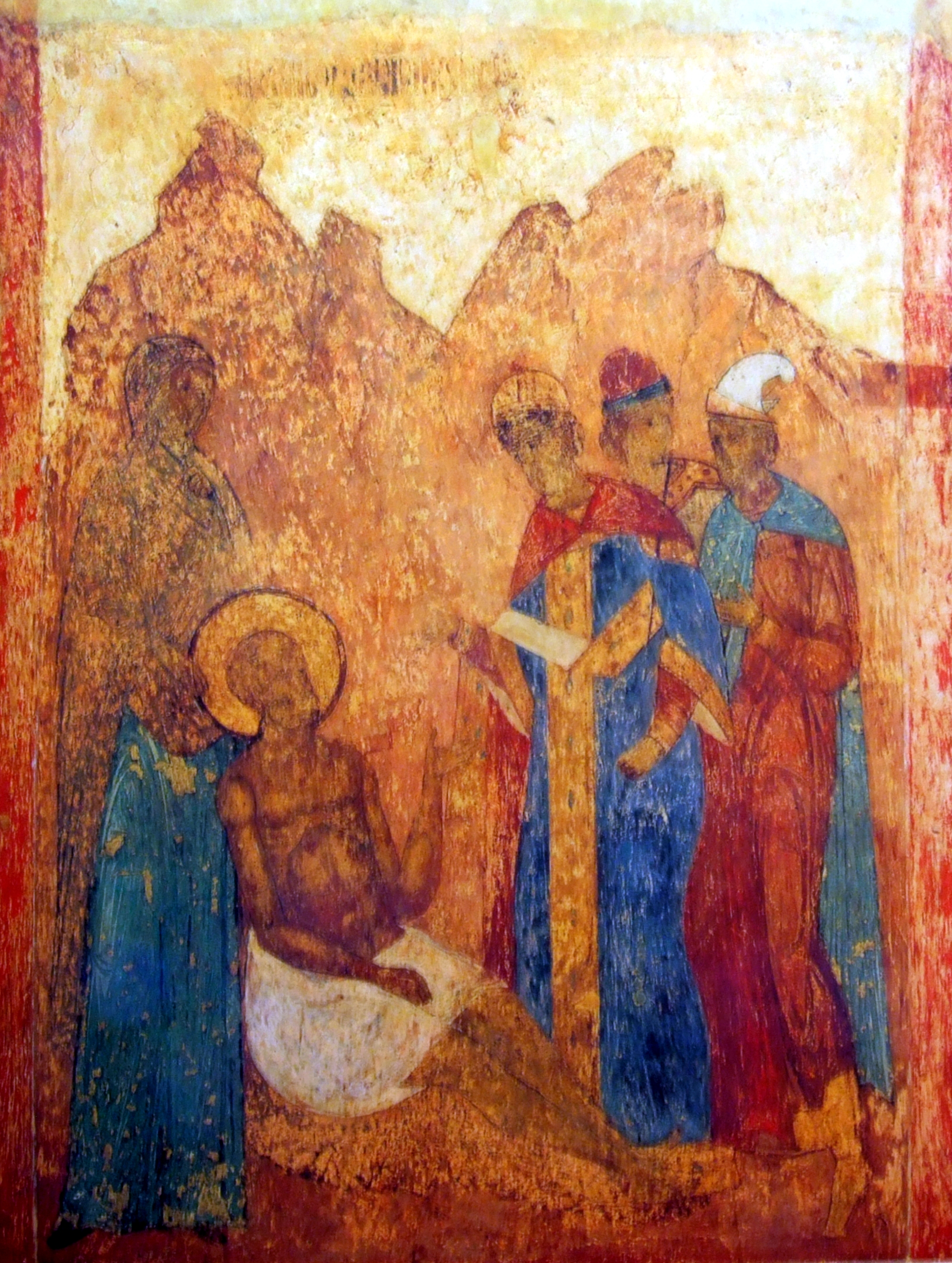
Fresco from the Cathedral of the Annunciation in Moscow depicting Job and his friends.

Eliphaz (Hebrew: אֱלִיפָז ’Ělīp̄āz, "El is pure gold") is called a Temanite (Job 4:1). He is one of the friends or comforters of Job in the Book of Job in the Hebrew Bible.

The first of the three visitors to Job (Job 2:11), he was said to have come from Teman, an important city of Edom (Amos 1:12; Obadiah 9). Thus Eliphaz appears as the representative of the wisdom of the Edomites, which, according to Obadiah 8, Jeremiah 49:7, and Baruch 3:22, was famous in antiquity.

As an alternative to the interpretation "El is pure gold", or "My God is pure gold", it has also been suggested that the name might mean something along the lines of "My God is separate" or "My God is remote".

== Name ==
The name "Eliphaz" for the spokesman of Edomite wisdom may have been suggested to the author of Job by the tradition which gave the name Eliphaz to Esau's eldest son, the father of Teman (Genesis 36:11; 1 Chronicles 1:35–36).

== Book of Job ==
In the arguments that pass between Job and his friends, it is Eliphaz who opens each of the three series of discussions:

- Chapters 4-5, with Job's reply in chapters 6-7
- Chapter 15, with Job's reply in chapters 16-17
- Chapter 22, with Job's reply in chapters 23-24.

American theologian Albert Barnes suggests that, because he spoke first each time, Eliphaz may have been the eldest of the friends. Eliphaz appears mild and modest. In his first reply to Job's complaints, he argues that those who are truly good are never entirely forsaken by Providence, but that punishment may justly be inflicted for secret sins. He denies that any man is innocent and censures Job for asserting his freedom from guilt. Eliphaz exhorts Job to confess any concealed iniquities to alleviate his punishment. His arguments are well supported but God declares at the end of the book that Eliphaz has made a serious error in his speaking. Job offers a sacrifice to God for Eliphaz's error.

His primary belief was that the righteous do not perish; the wicked alone suffer, and in measure as they have sinned (Job 4:7–9).

=== Eliphaz's dream ===
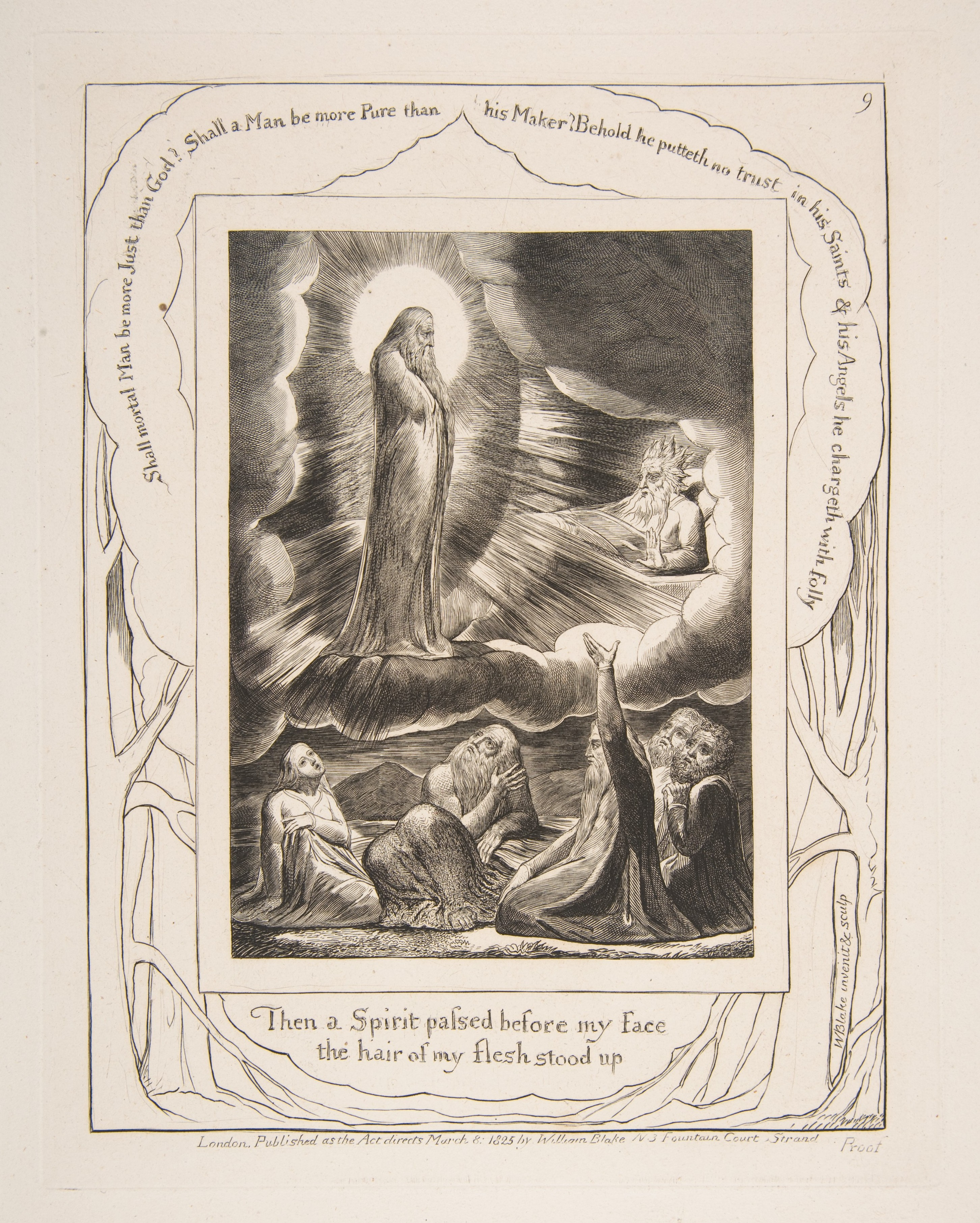
"The Vision of Eliphaz", from Illustrations of the Book of Job, by William Blake (c. 1825–1826).

Eliphaz's argument is, in part, rooted in what he believes to have been a personal revelation which he received through a dream (Job 4:12-16): "an elusive word [stole] past, quiet like a whisper", and after a silence he heard a voice saying:

Can mankind be just before God? Can a man be pure before his Maker? He puts no trust even in His servants; And against His angels He charges error. How much more those who dwell in houses of clay".

Eliphaz feels empowered to confront Job because of his dream. Crenshaw notes that he missed "the irony of this reference to God's lack of trust in his servants".

Some authors consider that Job's words in Job 9:2 are a response to this "revelation" of Eliphaz:

In truth I know that this is so; but how can a man be in the right before God? If one wished to dispute with Him, he could not answer Him once in a thousand times.

Albert Barnes refers to one of the Rosenmüllers as taking this approach. However, the words are different and form part of Job's reply to Bildad, the second friend: Barnes notes that "it seems more probable that it is [a reply] to the general position which had been laid down and defended, that God was just and holy, and that his proceedings were marked with equity". Eliphaz refers to the content of his dream again for emphasis in Job 15:14–16:

If God puts no trust in His saints, And the heavens are not pure in His sight, How much less man, who is abominable and filthy, Who drinks iniquity like water!

Bildad also refers to Eliphaz's revelation in chapter 25, although he presents the concept as his own. Job rebukes him for it:

"What a help you are to the weak! How you have saved the arm without strength! What counsel you have given to one without wisdom! What helpful insight you have abundantly provided! To whom have you uttered words? And whose spirit was expressed through you?"

Job pokes fun at Bildad asking him what spirit revealed it to him because he recognizes the argument as Eliphaz's spiritual revelation.

=== Eliphaz' final speech ===
Although quick-witted, and quick to respond, Eliphaz loses his composure in chapter 22, in the third and final round of speeches, accusing Job of specific faults, "sins against justice and charity towards others": oppressing widows and orphans, refusing bread to the hungry: a far cry from how he had originally described Job in his first address to him:

Behold you have admonished many, and you have strengthened weak hands. Your words have helped the tottering to stand, and you have strengthened feeble knees. But now it has come to you, and you are impatient; it touches you, and you are dismayed. Is not your fear of God your confidence, and the integrity of your ways your hope?

Eliphaz also misconstrues Job's message as he scrambles to summarize Job's thoughts from chapter 21:

You say, "What does God know? Can He judge through the thick darkness? Clouds are a hiding place for Him, so that He cannot see; And He walks on the vault of heaven."

Job did not argue that God could not prevent evil. Job was observing that in this life God often chooses not to prevent evil. Conventional wisdom told Eliphaz that God should immediately punish the wicked as that would be the just thing to do. Job, however, saw it differently, and in 24:1, Job laments

Why does the Almighty not set times for judgment? Why must those who know him look in vain for such days?

Job yearns for the justice Eliphaz claims exists – an immediate punishment of the wicked. However, that simply did not hold true according to Job's observations. Nevertheless, Job does not question God's ultimate justice. He knows justice will eventually be served. Job asks

"For what hope have the godless when they are cut off, when God takes away their life? Does God listen to their cry when distress comes upon them?"

== See also ==
- Bildad
- Elihu
- Zophar
