= Zophar =

Biblical figure, an associate of Job

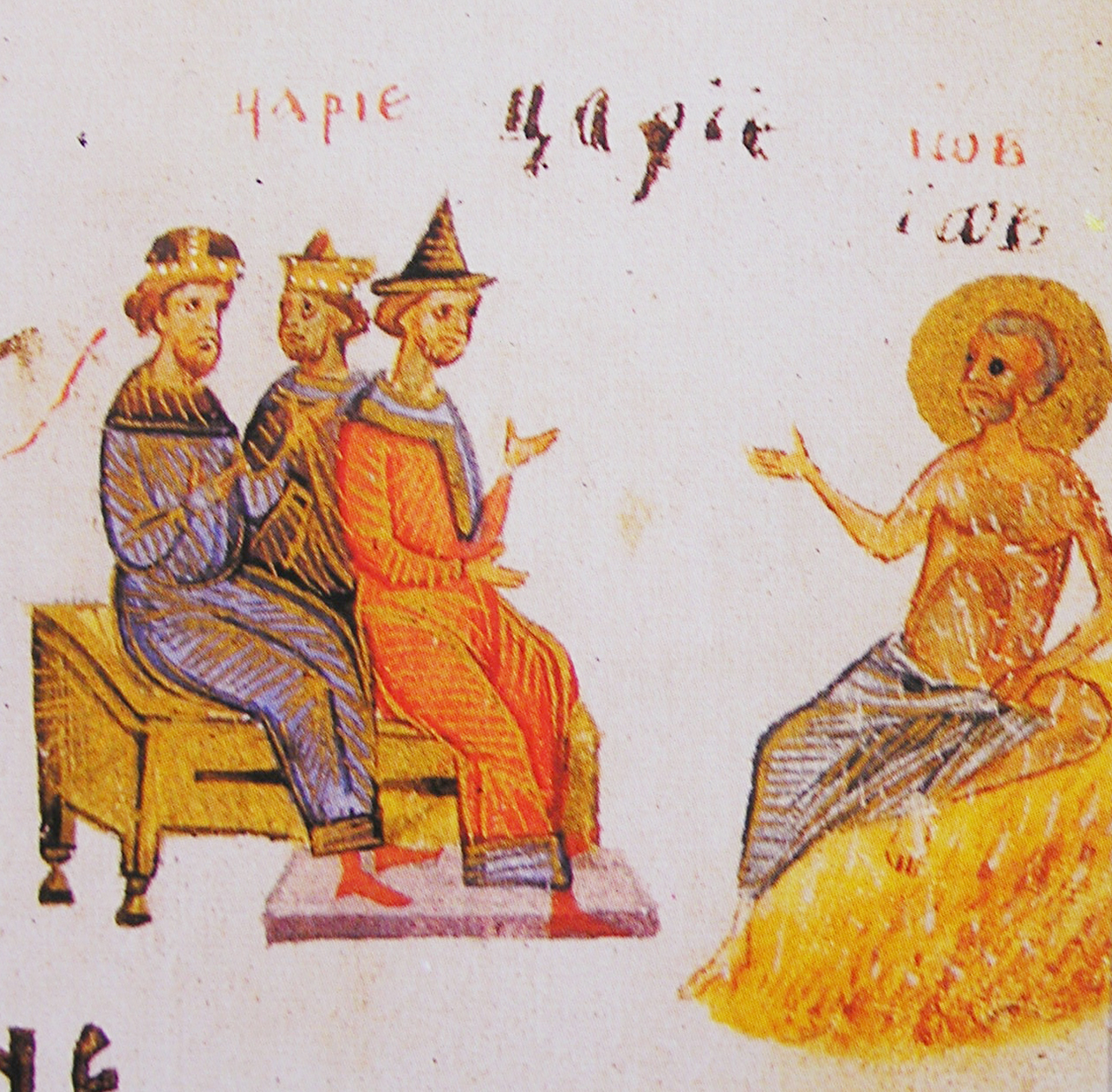
Illustration of Job and his friends from the Kiev Psalter of 1397

Zophar (Hebrew: צוֹפַר Ṣōp̄ar, "chirping"; "rising early"; also Tzofar) the Naamathite is one of the three friends of Job who visit him during his illness in the Book of Job (c. 6th century BCE?), Hebrew Bible / Old Testament. Naamathite is a Gentile name, suggesting he was from a city called Naamah, perhaps in Arabia.

Zophar's comments can be found in Job 11:1–20 and Job 20:1–29. He suggests that Job's suffering could be divine punishment, and goes into great detail about the consequences of living a life of sin.

== Speeches ==
Zophar only speaks twice to Job, unlike friends Bildad and Eliphaz who each give three speeches. Zophar is the most impetuous and dogmatic of Job's three visitors: He is the first to accuse Job directly of wickedness; claiming that God might have forgotten some of Job’s iniquity (Job 11:6), and he rebukes Job's impious presumption in trying to find out the unsearchable secrets of God (Job 11:7–12). Despite his dogmatic speech, Zophar promises Job peace and restoration, on condition of penitence and putting away iniquity (Job 11:13–19), redoubling the promises of Job's other visitors.

Zophar's second speech is a lecture on the fate of the wicked, ending with a summary appraisal, in the same style as his friend Bildad,

This is the portion of the wicked, the heritage appointed him by God.

== See also ==
- Bildad
- Eliphaz
- Elihu
