= Neriah =

Biblical figure, father of Baruch and Seraiah

Neriah (Hebrew: נֵרִיָּה Nērīyyā, "My lamp is Jah") is the son of Mahseiah, and the father of Baruch and Seraiah ben Neriah. He is mentioned in the Book of Jeremiah (32:12 and 51:59) of the Hebrew Bible.

== Talmud ==
The Talmud lists him and his sons as prophets.

== Historicity ==
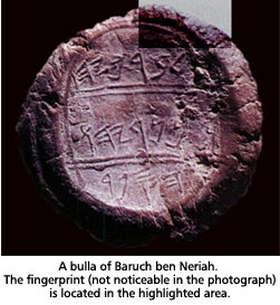
Bulla purported to bear the seal of Neriah's son, Baruch

In 1975, a clay bulla purportedly containing Baruch's seal and name appeared on the antiquities market. Its purchaser, a prominent Israeli collector, permitted the Israeli archaeologist Nahman Avigad to publish the bulla. Although its source is not definitively known, it has been identified as coming from the "burnt house" excavated by Yigal Shiloh. The bulla is now in the Israel Museum. It measures 17 by 16 mm and is stamped with an oval seal, 13 by 11 mm. The inscription, written in the ancient Hebrew alphabet, reads:

Line	Transliteration	Translation
1	lbrkyhw	[belonging] to Baruchyahu
2	bn nryhw	son of Neriyahu
3	hspr	the scribe

In 1996, a second clay bulla emerged with an identical inscription, presumably stamped with the same seal. This bulla was also imprinted with a fingerprint; Hershel Shanks, among others, speculated that the fingerprint might be that of Baruch himself. The authenticity of these bullae, however, has been disputed.^{ibid.}

Another bulla was found with the name of "Seraiahu, son of Neriyahu", believed to belong to Seraiah ben Neriah.

== See also ==
- Book of Baruch
- King Ahaz's seal
- List of inscriptions in biblical archaeology
