= Salalah =

Salalah صَلَالَة
- City
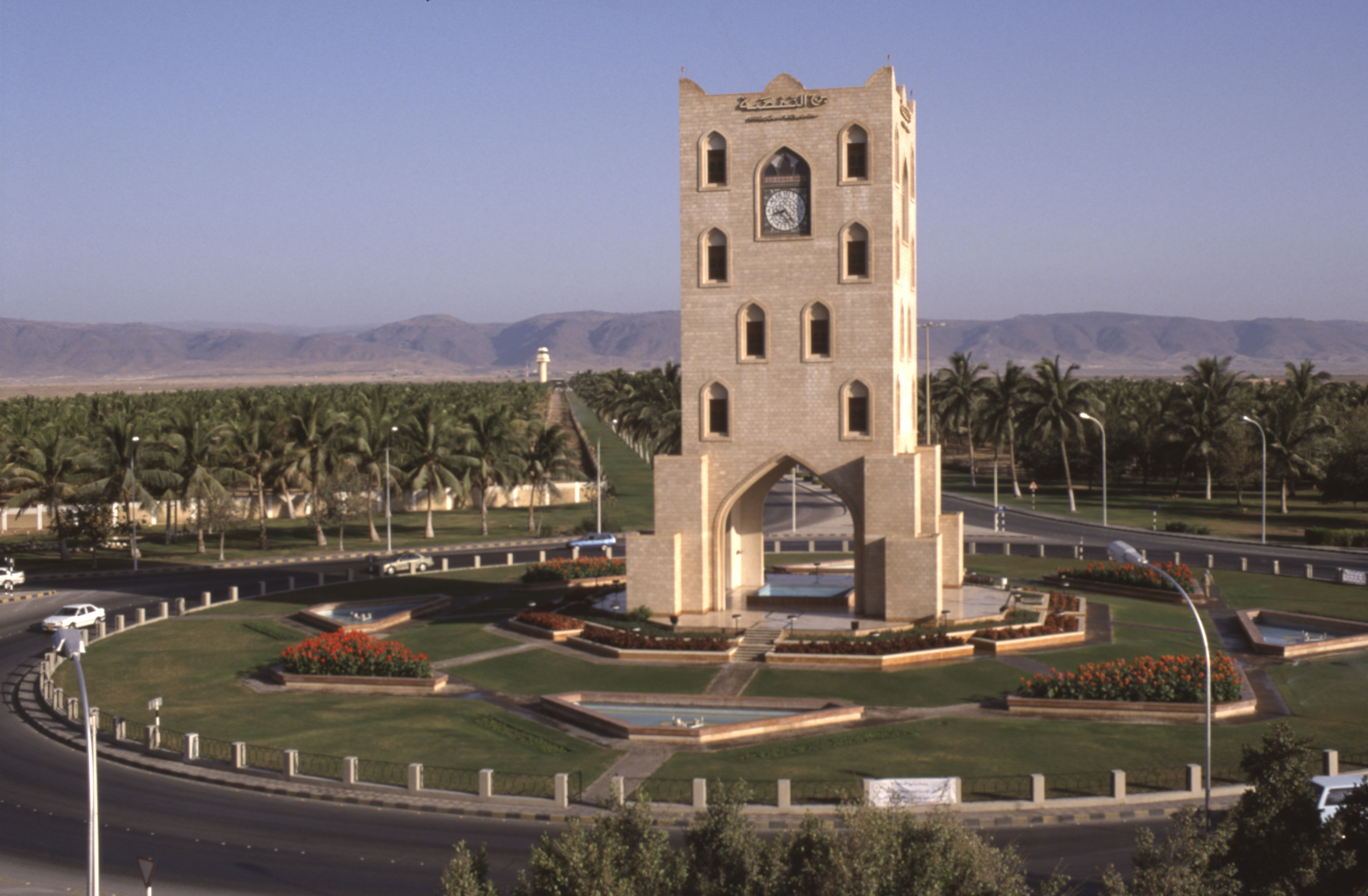
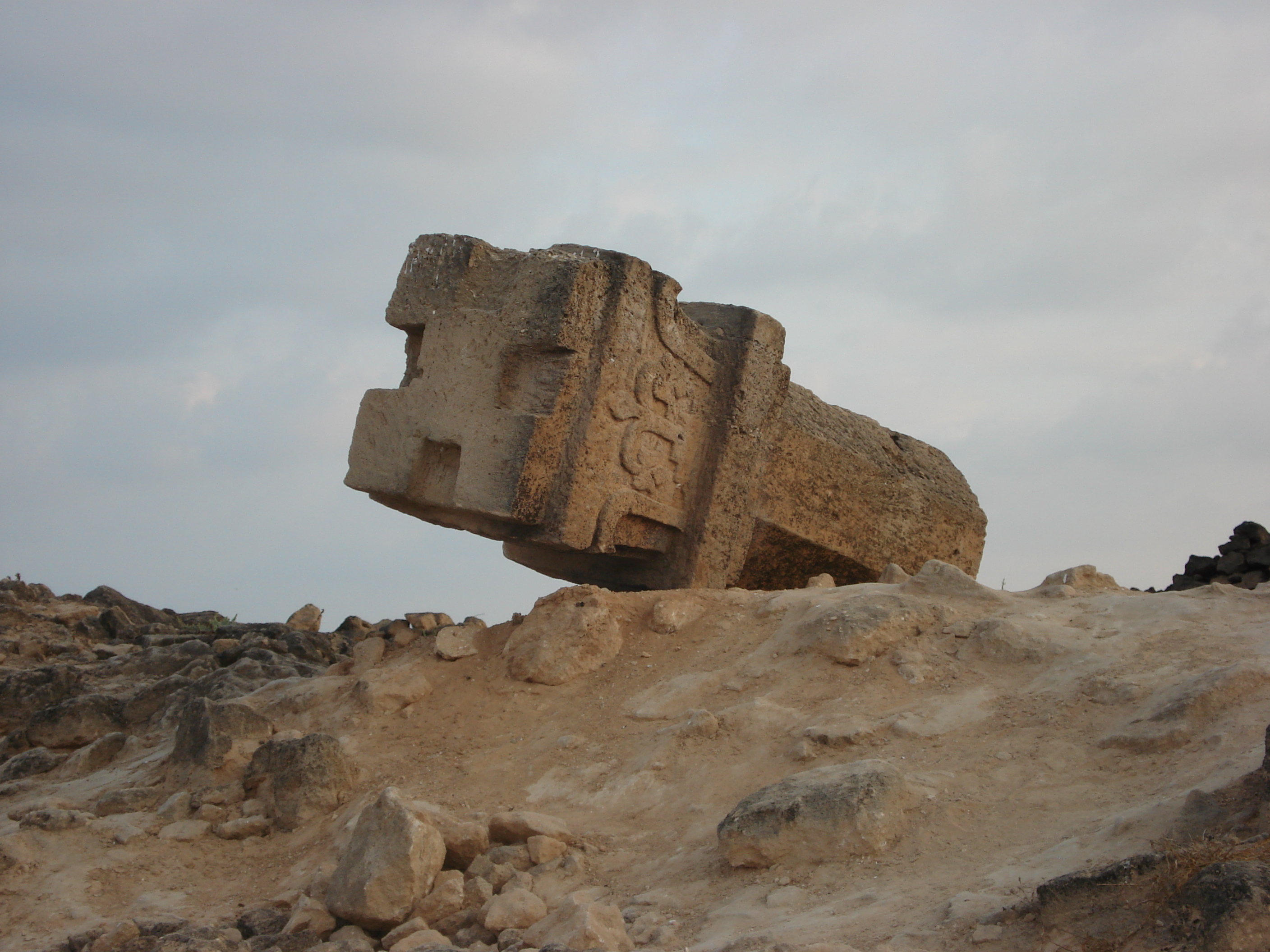
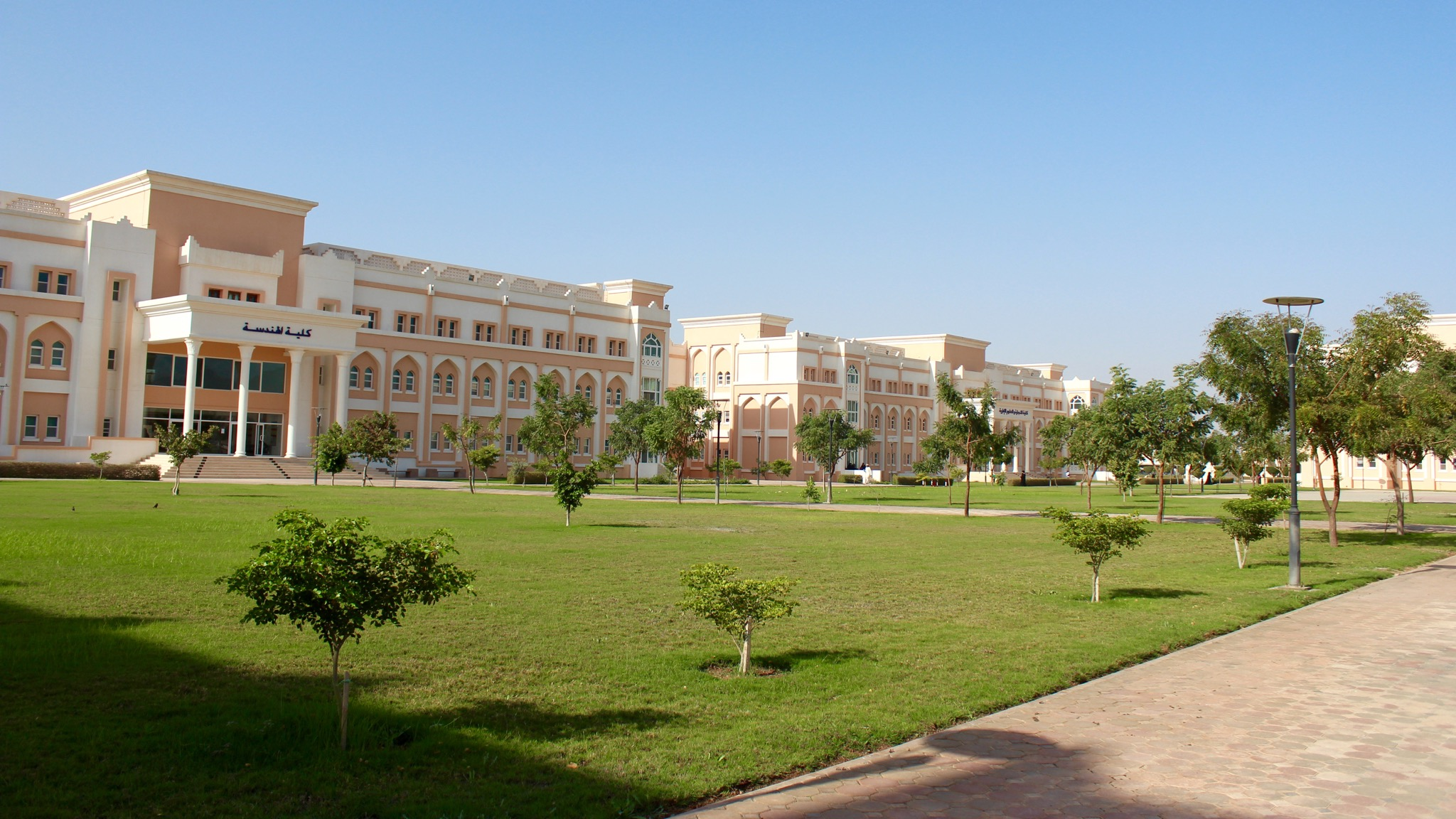
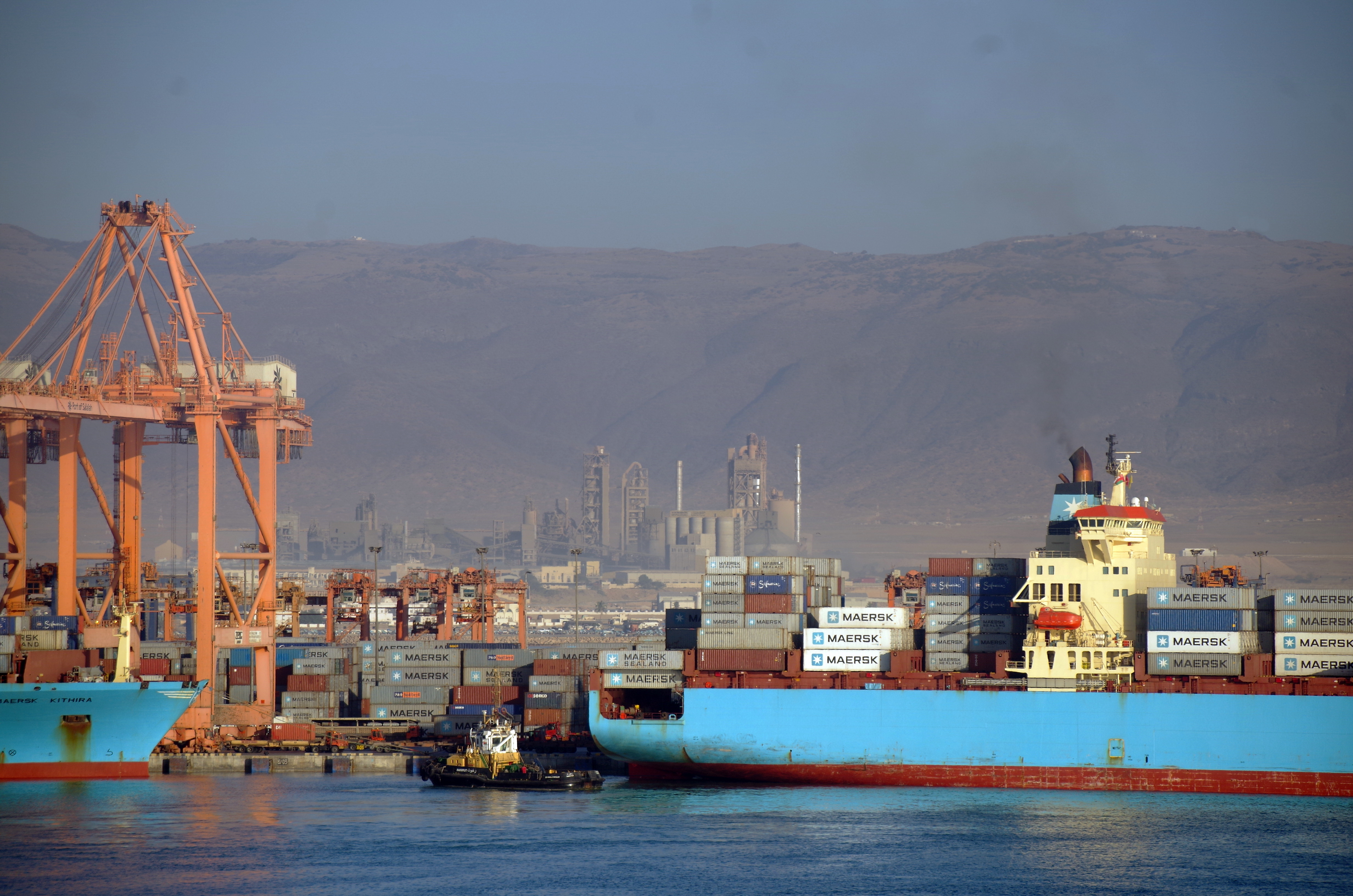
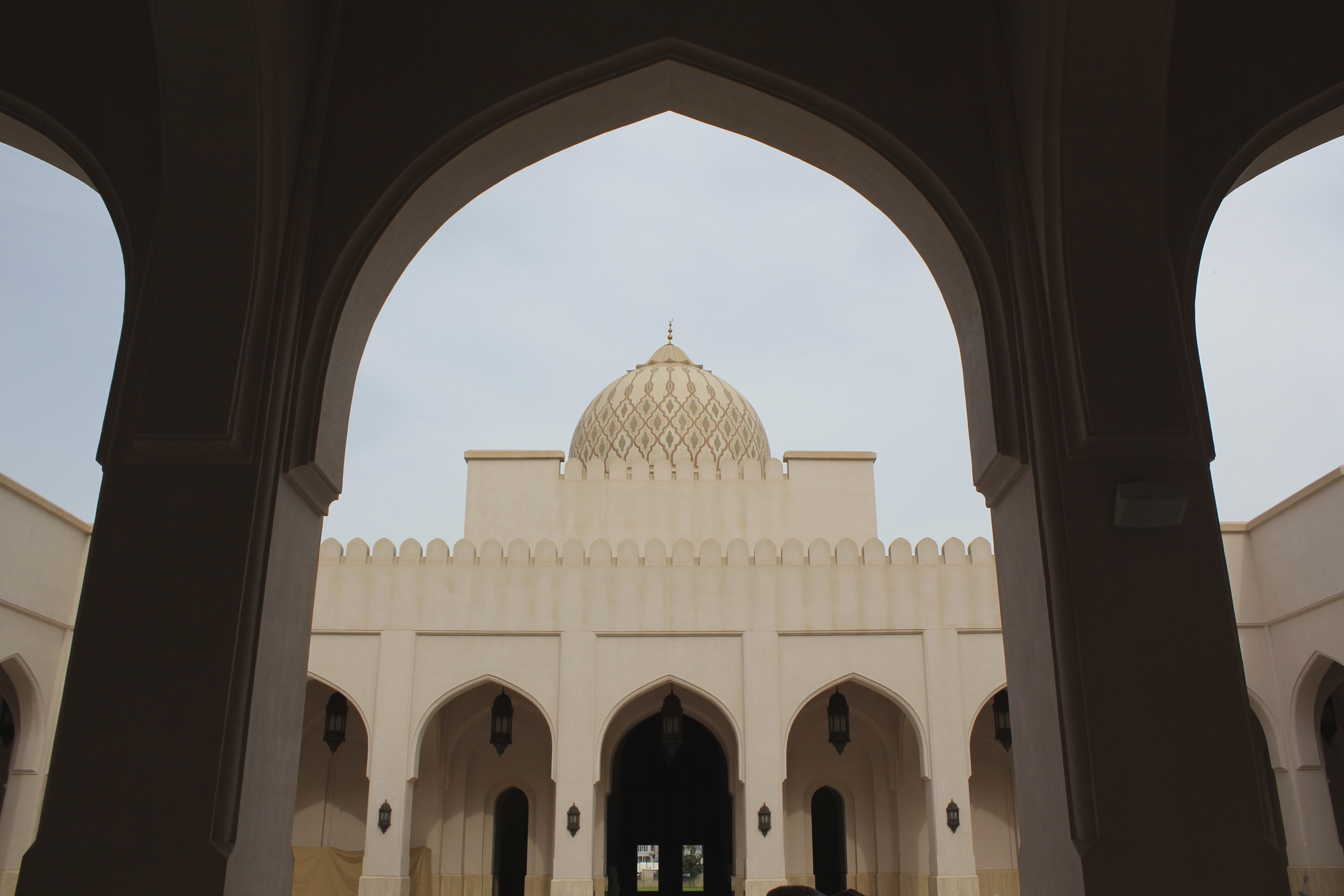
- Burj al Nahda Al-Baleed Archaeological Park Dhofar University Port of Salalah Sultan Qaboos Mosque
- Nickname: "Land of Authenticity"
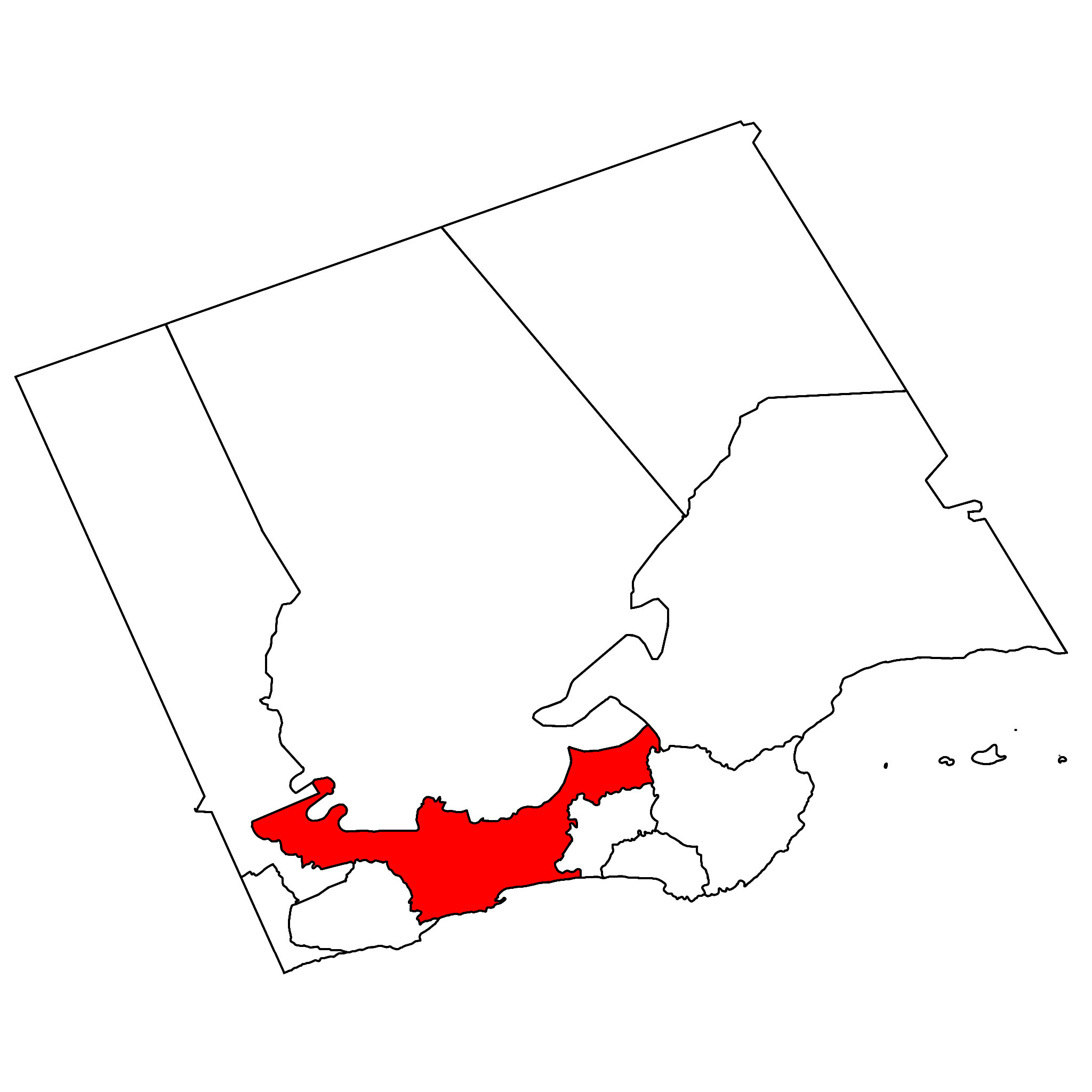
- Wilayat of Salalah in the Dhofar Governorate

- Location of Salalah in Oman Salalah (Asia)
- Coordinates: 17°01′11″N 54°05′23″E
- Country: Oman
- Governorate: Dhofar

Government
  - Type: Absolute monarchy
  - Sultan: Haitham bin Tariq Al Said

Area
  - Metro: 1,500 km^{2} (580 sq mi)

Population (2020)
  - Density: 491/km^{2} (1,270/sq mi)
  - Metro: 440,000
- Time zone: UTC+04:00 (GST)

Salalah (Arabic: صَلَالَة, romanized: Ṣalālah) is the capital and largest city of the southern Omani governorate of Dhofar. It has a population close to 331,949.

Salalah is the third-largest city in the Sultanate of Oman, and the largest city in the Dhofar province. Salalah is the birthplace of former Omani Sultan Qaboos bin Said. Salalah attracts many tourists from other parts of Oman and from abroad during the monsoon/khareef season, from June to September. The climate of the region and the monsoon allow the city to grow some vegetables and fruits like coconut and bananas. There are many gardens within the city where these vegetables and fruits grow.

== History ==
Salalah currently is and was the traditional capital of Dhofar, which reached the peak of prosperity in the 13th century thanks to the incense trade. Later it decayed, and in the 19th century it was absorbed by the Sultanate of Muscat and Oman.

Between 1932 and 1970, Salalah was the residence of Sultan Said bin Taimur. His son, Qaboos, who acceded to his father's throne in 1970, decided to move his capital to Muscat, the largest city in Oman, where he lived until he quietly left for treatment in Germany. Sultan Qaboos's absence was much regretted in Salalah, where his palace was always kept ready to receive him. His last visits were in 2006 to meet influential tribal and local leaders, and in 2010 to celebrate the 40th anniversary of his accession with a massive parade watched for several hours by an estimated 100,000 spectators.

Despite the Sultan's generally benevolent government running Oman without national taxation, thanks to its vast mineral resources, and with all menial work done by Asian labourers, Salalah saw peaceful protests for a few months in 2011 in the domino effect of the Arab Spring. Some Omani protesters demanded the dismissal of current ministers, better job opportunities, salary increases, a solution to the increasing cost of living, or the establishment of Islamic banks.

== Demographics ==
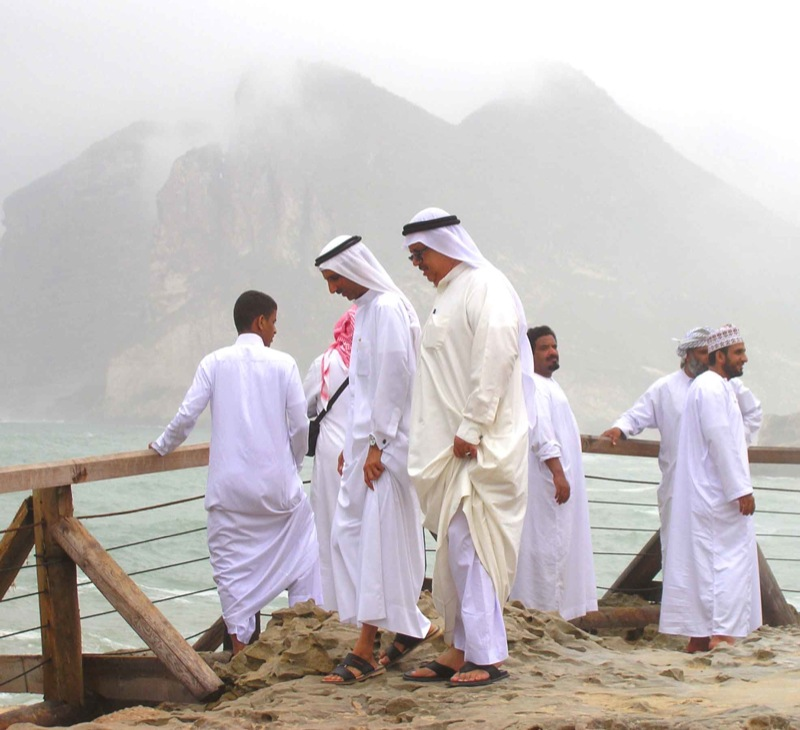
Men at the al-Mughsayl coast

=== Religion ===
The city, like many other in Arab states of the Arabian Peninsula, has a relatively large expatriate community, mainly from India, Pakistan, Bangladesh, and the Philippines.

The majority of the Omani population (98.9%) in Salalah is Muslim. Unlike Omanis on the eastern coast of Oman in and around Muscat, most of whom are Ibadis, most Muslims in Salalah follow the Sunni sect of Islam. There is also a considerable population of Hindus, Christians, Buddhists, and Sikhs in the expatriate community.

=== Language ===
Arabic is the official language. The unofficial, unwritten non-Arabic language known as Shehri is the second most spoken language and the mother tongue of many in Salalah and its surrounding areas, with 25,000 estimated speakers as of 1993.

English is the official foreign language and the most spoken language of the expats. Malayalam is another popular language and together with Tamil, Telugu, along with Urdu, Hindi, European Spanish, Catalan, Romanian and Somali are widely spoken language among expatriates.

== Economy ==
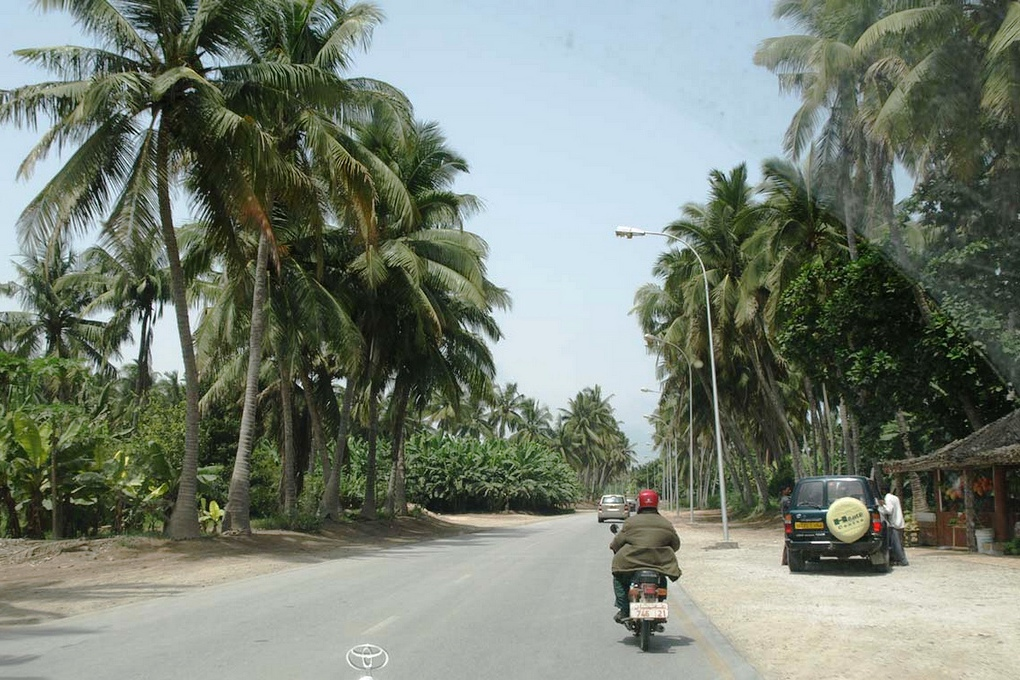
Fruit stalls sell local fruits and tender coconut

APM Terminals, part of the A. P. Moller-Maersk Group of Denmark, manages the Port of Salalah; one of the largest ports on the Arabian Peninsula which is an important transshipment hub for container shipping in the area. The Port of Salalah is also one of the most vital ports on the peninsula connecting together Africa, the Middle East, and Asia. But the port is outside the city, to the south. It is also the largest private employer in the Dhofar region. The Salalah Free Zone, situated right beside the port, is emerging as a new center for heavy industries in the Middle East.

=== Tourism ===
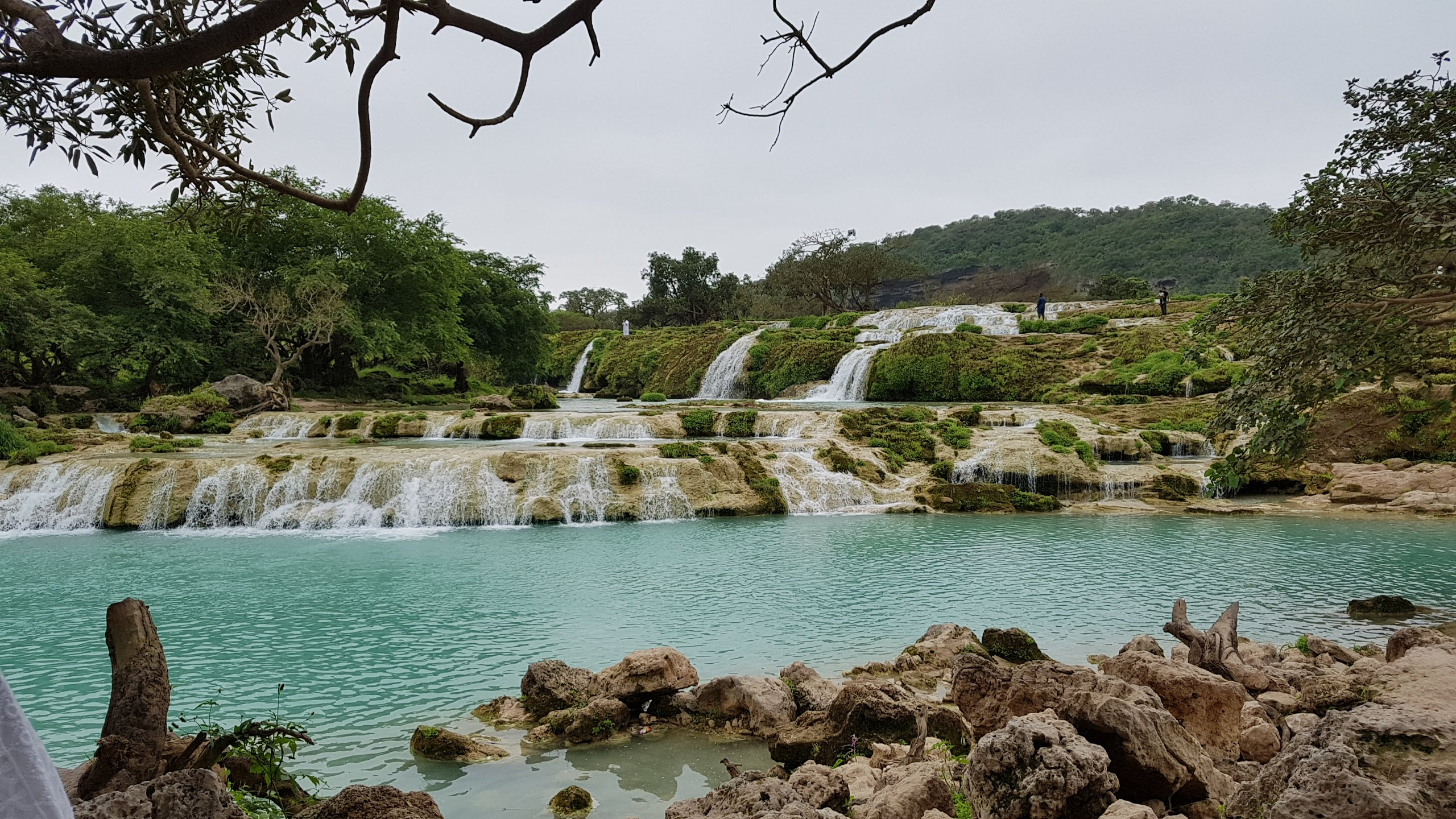
Wadi Darbat

Salalah has an international tourist economy with many Middle Eastern tourists during the Khareef season from June to September. In this season the mountains turn green, and there are many waterfalls to visit, such as at Wadi Darbat, Ain Athum, Ain Tubrook, and Ain Khor. There are four reputed tombs of Islamic prophets: Nabi Imran, possibly the Virgin Mary's father but more likely a local prophet; Nabi Ayoob, the biblical Job; Nabi Houd; and Nabi Salih. The city received more than 600,000 tourists during the khareef season in 2017. Amongst the Dhofar Governorate's cultural attractions is the Salalah carnival, which includes the usual rides, family activities, concerts, cultural events and vendors.

One of Joachim's or Al Imran's believed graves is in Salalah; which is claimed to be the "longest grave in the world" (12 metres).

== Climate ==
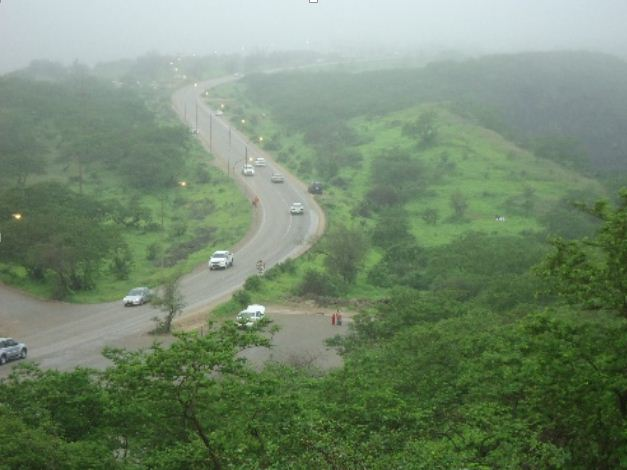
Salalah during Khareef Season (June to September)

The city has a hot desert climate (Köppen climate classification BWh), although summers are cooler than in more northern or inland parts of Oman. Salalah is very cloudy and foggy during the Monsoon of South Asia months of July and August, even though it receives relatively little rainfall. Khareef, خريف means "autumn" in Arabic, but it refers to monsoon when describing the region around Salalah. During this time, the brown landscape of Salalah and its surroundings are completely transformed to beautiful and lush green scenes. This provides picturesque scenes for photos.

Cyclone Mekunu, which originated over the Arabian Sea, became an extremely severe cyclone before hitting the Salalah city on 25 May 2018. 200 km/h was the recorded windspeed, and the city of Salalah was pounded with over 617 mm (24.3 in) of rainfall, which is almost 5 years of Oman's average rainfall.

Climate data for Salalah (Salalah International Airport) (1991–2020 normals, extremes 1960–1990, 1999–2023)
Month	Jan	Feb	Mar	Apr	May	Jun	Jul	Aug	Sep	Oct	Nov	Dec	Year
Record high °C (°F)	34.8 (94.6)	36.8 (98.2)	40.1 (104.2)	43.6 (110.5)	45.5 (113.9)	45.5 (113.9)	32.9 (91.2)	32.4 (90.3)	35.7 (96.3)	40.1 (104.2)	38.4 (101.1)	34.5 (94.1)	45.5 (113.9)
Mean daily maximum °C (°F)	27.5 (81.5)	28.1 (82.6)	30.1 (86.2)	31.8 (89.2)	32.8 (91.0)	31.9 (89.4)	28.3 (82.9)	27.2 (81.0)	29.5 (85.1)	31.2 (88.2)	31.0 (87.8)	29.3 (84.7)	29.9 (85.8)
Daily mean °C (°F)	23.4 (74.1)	24.1 (75.4)	26.1 (79.0)	28.3 (82.9)	29.7 (85.5)	29.4 (84.9)	26.4 (79.5)	25.3 (77.5)	26.6 (79.9)	27.2 (81.0)	26.7 (80.1)	24.9 (76.8)	26.5 (79.7)
Mean daily minimum °C (°F)	19.3 (66.7)	20.0 (68.0)	22.1 (71.8)	24.9 (76.8)	27.1 (80.8)	27.6 (81.7)	25.0 (77.0)	24.2 (75.6)	24.8 (76.6)	23.3 (73.9)	22.4 (72.3)	20.8 (69.4)	23.5 (74.2)
Record low °C (°F)	12.6 (54.7)	10.8 (51.4)	14.5 (58.1)	18.0 (64.4)	20.6 (69.1)	23.5 (74.3)	21.9 (71.4)	20.5 (68.9)	19.1 (66.4)	16.5 (61.7)	15.0 (59.0)	14.1 (57.4)	10.8 (51.4)
Average precipitation mm (inches)	1.1 (0.04)	0.3 (0.01)	5.3 (0.21)	4.0 (0.16)	24.1 (0.95)	6.1 (0.24)	20.6 (0.81)	18.6 (0.73)	8.4 (0.33)	5.1 (0.20)	1.9 (0.07)	3.6 (0.14)	99.1 (3.89)
Average precipitation days (≥ 1.0 mm)	0.2	0.1	0.6	0.4	0.8	1.2	7.1	6.8	1.2	0.4	0.2	0.2	19.2
Average relative humidity (%)	50	58	62	68	75	80	89	90	81	67	55	50	69
Mean monthly sunshine hours	289.6	256.8	297.6	308.3	335.1	199.5	43.9	42.4	188.0	314.7	304.7	296.8	2,877.4
Source 1: NOAA (humidity and sun 1961–1990)
Source 2: Starlings Roost Weather

Climate data for Salalah (Port of Salalah) (1991–2020 normals, extremes 1995–2021)
Month	Jan	Feb	Mar	Apr	May	Jun	Jul	Aug	Sep	Oct	Nov	Dec	Year
Record high °C (°F)	32.2 (90.0)	34.1 (93.4)	36.5 (97.7)	37.3 (99.1)	37.9 (100.2)	37.6 (99.7)	32.5 (90.5)	30.5 (86.9)	36.8 (98.2)	36.7 (98.1)	36.4 (97.5)	34.7 (94.5)	37.9 (100.2)
Mean daily maximum °C (°F)	27.1 (80.8)	27.5 (81.5)	29.1 (84.4)	30.3 (86.5)	31.3 (88.3)	30.2 (86.4)	26.9 (80.4)	26.1 (79.0)	28.0 (82.4)	29.8 (85.6)	30.2 (86.4)	28.7 (83.7)	28.8 (83.8)
Daily mean °C (°F)	23.5 (74.3)	24.1 (75.4)	25.8 (78.4)	27.8 (82.0)	29.1 (84.4)	28.4 (83.1)	25.2 (77.4)	24.4 (75.9)	25.8 (78.4)	26.6 (79.9)	26.6 (79.9)	25.0 (77.0)	26.0 (78.8)
Mean daily minimum °C (°F)	20.0 (68.0)	20.5 (68.9)	22.5 (72.5)	25.2 (77.4)	27.1 (80.8)	27.0 (80.6)	24.1 (75.4)	23.4 (74.1)	24.2 (75.6)	23.6 (74.5)	23.1 (73.6)	21.5 (70.7)	23.5 (74.3)
Record low °C (°F)	12.4 (54.3)	14.0 (57.2)	16.7 (62.1)	19.9 (67.8)	22.7 (72.9)	22.2 (72.0)	21.5 (70.7)	20.1 (68.2)	20.6 (69.1)	19.2 (66.6)	19.0 (66.2)	16.4 (61.5)	12.4 (54.3)
Average precipitation mm (inches)	2.0 (0.08)	0.3 (0.01)	3.8 (0.15)	1.1 (0.04)	7.0 (0.28)	5.5 (0.22)	34.7 (1.37)	22.9 (0.90)	14.3 (0.56)	4.3 (0.17)	10.2 (0.40)	1.0 (0.04)	107.1 (4.22)
Average precipitation days (≥ 1.0 mm)	0.4	0.1	0.4	0.2	0.7	1.3	9.3	7.5	1.3	0.4	0.8	0.2	22.6
Source: Starlings Roost Weather

== Sports ==
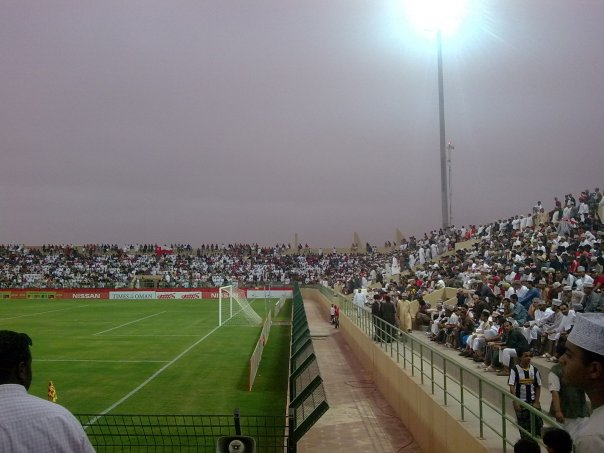
Al-Saada Stadium

Salalah is known as the home of some of the best football clubs in Oman. In total, Salalah has four sport clubs based in the city: Salalah Club, Al-Ittihad, Al-Nasr, and Dhofar (the most successful club in the League with 11 trophies).

Dhofar F.C. have been nicknamed as "Al-Zaeem", or "The Leader(s)", due to their enormous success in both the Omani League, and in the Sultan Qaboos Cup. Dhofar also have an adequate number of trophies in sports like volleyball, and handball. Al-Nasr have also been known for their great success in football, winning the Omani League five times, and the Sultan Qaboos Cup 4 times. Al-Nasr, like Dhofar, have also been successful in other sports such as hockey, basketball, volleyball, and handball.

Salalah currently has two stadiums, the Salalah Sports Complex (also known as the "Youth Sports Complex"), which is the only multi-purpose stadium in Salalah. The newer, Al-Saadah Stadium is the newly built stadium in Al-Saada district of Salalah devoted to football. Incorporated in the walls of the sports complex apart from the football stadium is a hockey field, tennis court, Olympic swimming pool, and indoor volleyball/basketball court. Al-Saada Stadium is the venue where Saudi national football team, and the Omani national team first met in Salalah on August 12, 2009.

The most popular sport played among the youth is by far football. It is very normal to see a group of boys and young men from around the area playing in makeshift fields in parking lots, or in a large open area. Beach football is also a common sight to see along the beach in the Al-Haffa district. Another popular sport in Salalah is volleyball. Although not as popular as football the game is frequently played, special in the beach of Salalah.

In December 2026, Salalah will host the finish of the Budapest–Baghdad–Salalah Rally, a transcontinental endurance rally spanning over 10,000 kilometers. The route starts in Budapest and passes through numerous countries across Europe and the Middle East – including Iraq and Saudi Arabia – before reaching its final destination in southern Oman. The event is a unique blend of adventure travel and motorsport, where participants compete or tour in various vehicle categories such as motorcycles, cars, quads, and side-by-sides. Designed in the spirit of minimalist assistance, the rally combines challenging navigation with cultural interaction, aiming to showcase the natural beauty and hospitality of the regions along the route. Salalah, as the endpoint, plays a symbolic and celebratory role, highlighting its geographical and cultural significance.

== Education ==
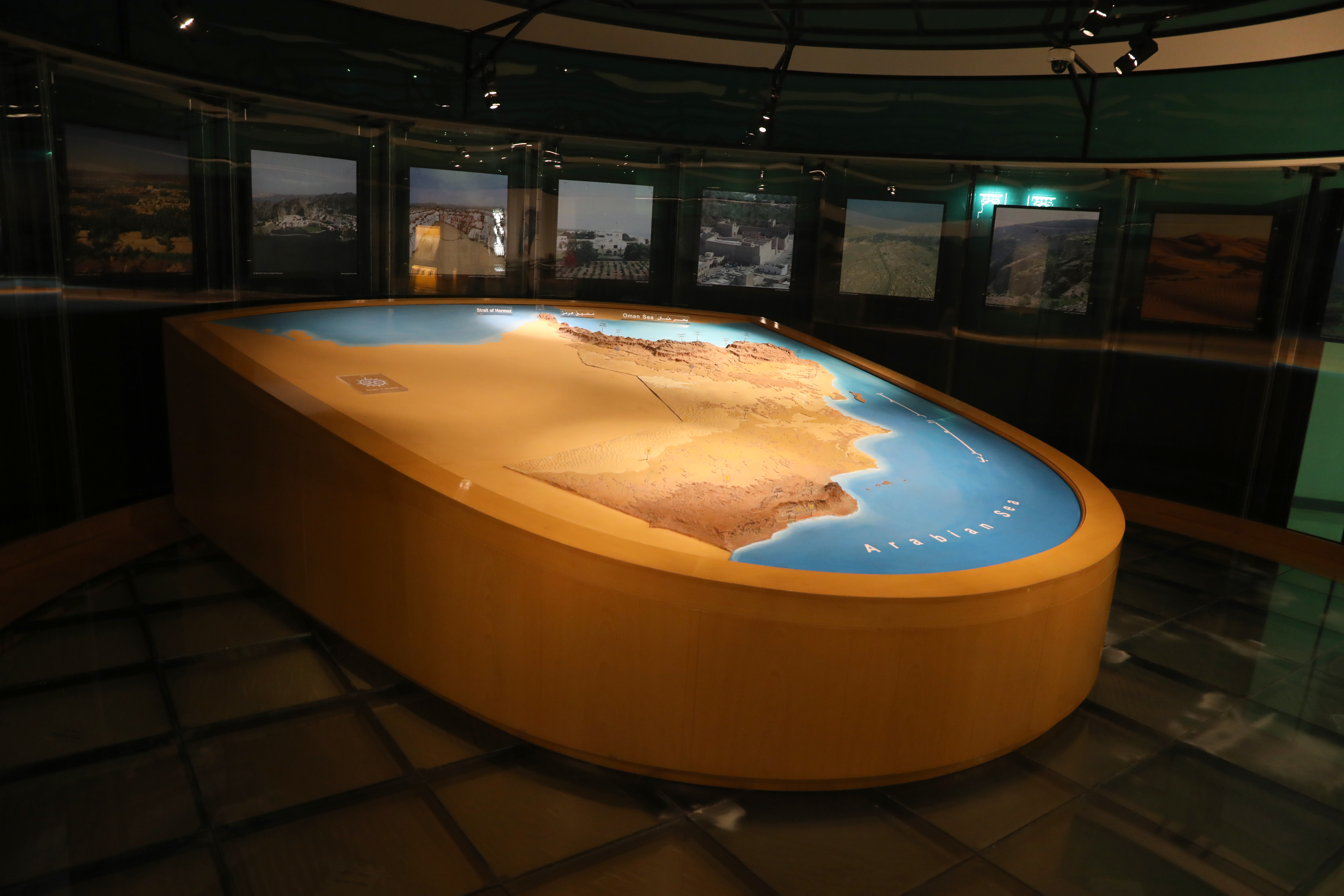
Museum of the Land of Frankincense

Currently Salalah has two colleges, the Salalah College of Technology and Salalah College of Applied Science, both of which are government owned and sponsored.

The Salalah College of Applied Sciences incorporates an English Department. Its aim is to offer students a solid grasp of the English language so that they may go on to complete further studies in important sectors such as I.T. and Communication and Design.

Salalah is also home to a private university, Dhofar University which is one of the largest in the region. It has significant shares owned by Mustahil Al-Mashani, uncle of Sultan Qaboos bin Said. Recently the university has constructed a new campus worth 25 million OR. British School Salalah was founded in 1970. The school follows the National Curriculum of England and Wales, and offers schooling to children from Reception to Year 10 (Year 11 from August 2021). It is also situated in Dahariz next to the Indian School and Pakistani School.

The Indian School Salalah, established in 1981, is an Indian-run, self-financing, co-educational institution, primarily established to meet the academic needs of children of Indian expatriates working in Salalah.

== Transportation ==
=== Air transport ===
Salalah International Airport mainly caters to domestic flights from Muscat and some International flights from India and regional Arab countries such as Qatar, U.A.E, and Saudi Arabia. Oman Air, the national airline operates five flights daily from Salalah to Muscat, the capital city and also two flights to Dubai weekly.

Oman Air introduced Oman Air Pass for regular travelers between Salalah and Muscat. Qatar Airways has daily flights from Salalah to Doha connecting to over 130 destinations worldwide.

Very convenient connections are available to destinations in Europe, the Americas, Africa, Asia and Australia. There is also a direct weekly flight from and to Kochi, Kozhikode (Calicut) for the Malayalee expatriates. During the Khareef Season (Monsoons) there are weekly flights to other international destinations including Sweden and Turkey. There are also transit flights to almost all countries.

The new International airport opened on 15 June 2015 and the old Airport has since then been converted into a Domestic and emergency Airport.

=== Bus ===
There is a daily bus service from Deira, Dubai, UAE to Salalah at 3pm. There is daily bus service between Muscat and Salalah from many bus service providers.

=== Public transport ===
Salalah did not have a public transportation system within the city limits until 2018, but in 2019 Sultan Qaboos announced a bus service within the city from Salalah airport to city center and city center to Salalah port.

Oman National Transport Company (Mwasalat) has started daily public bus service in Salalah from December 2018.

Long-distance air-conditioned buses are operated daily from Salalah to Haima, Muscat, Nizwa, Al-Buraimi, Dubai, Al-Ain, Al-Ghaydah, Mukalla, and Seiyun, as well as PDO locations such as Marmul.

Other forms of public transport popular in Salalah are taxis. Generally fares vary from half a Rial to 2 Rials depending on the distance to destination. Taxis are color-coded orange and white and provide semi-personal transportation in the form of both individual hire and the same opportunistic roadway service as Baisa buses, which are not as popular in the city.

Minibuses, colour-coded orange and white, are unmetered like taxis, after several government initiatives to introduce meters were rejected. The fare is set by way of negotiation, although drivers usually adhere to certain unwritten rules for fares within the city. One should always find out the normally accepted fare for one's journey from one's hotel or host before looking for a taxi.

=== Water transport ===
The Port of Salalah is one of the deepwater ports in Oman and also eleventh-busiest transshipment port in the world, second-busiest port in the Middle East, which is located at Port Raysut (Salalah). It can accommodate large vessels up to 18m draft. It is the main container tran-shipment terminal of the region. This port is operated and managed by Salalah Port Services Company (S.A.O.G.). The port also welcomes cruise liners and luxury ships.

== City districts and suburbs ==
- Al-Dahariz
- Al-Haffa
- Al-Qouf
- Al-Mughsail
- Al-Mutaaza
- Al-Saada
- Al-Wadi
- Auqad
- City Center
- Eastern Salalah
- Ittin
- New Salalah (Salalah Al-Jadidah)
- Western Salalah (also known as Al-Gharbia, and Al-Qantra)

== Gallery ==
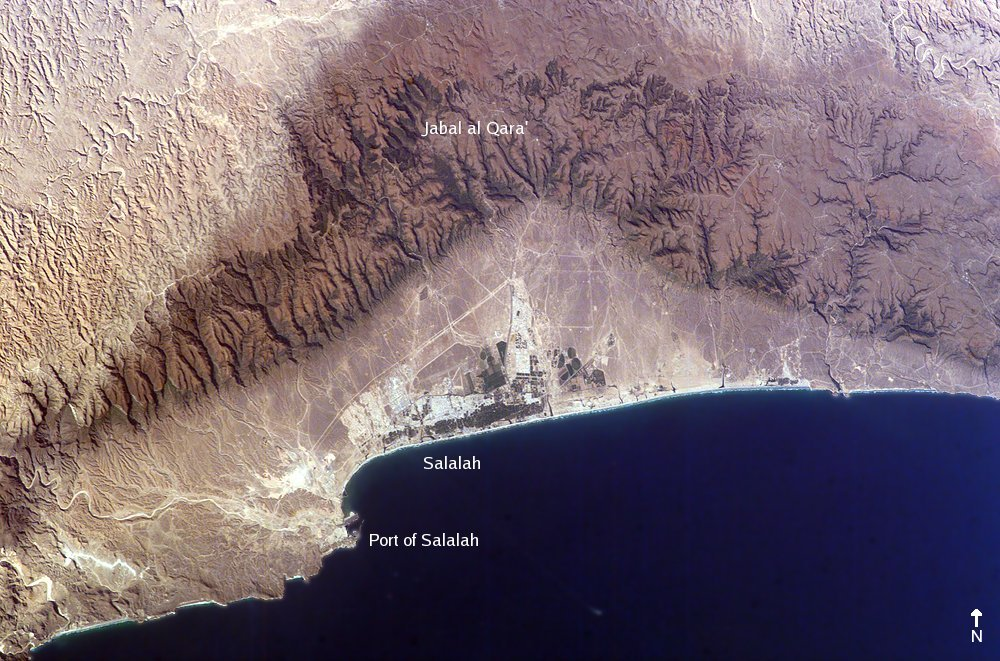
Satellite view of Salalah

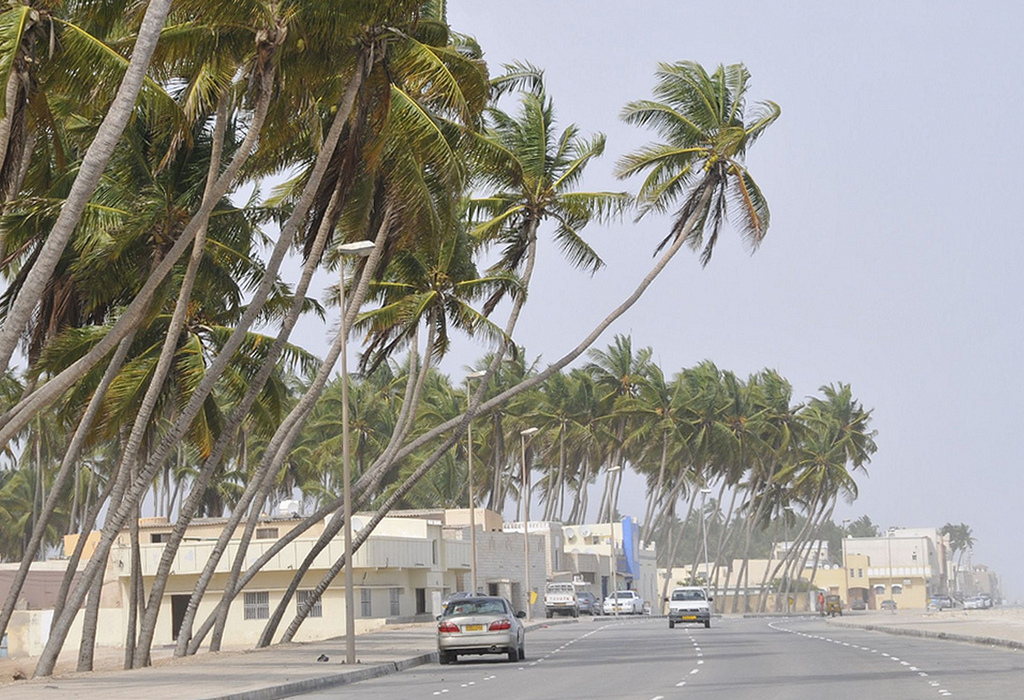
Al Hafa Corniche, near Salalah

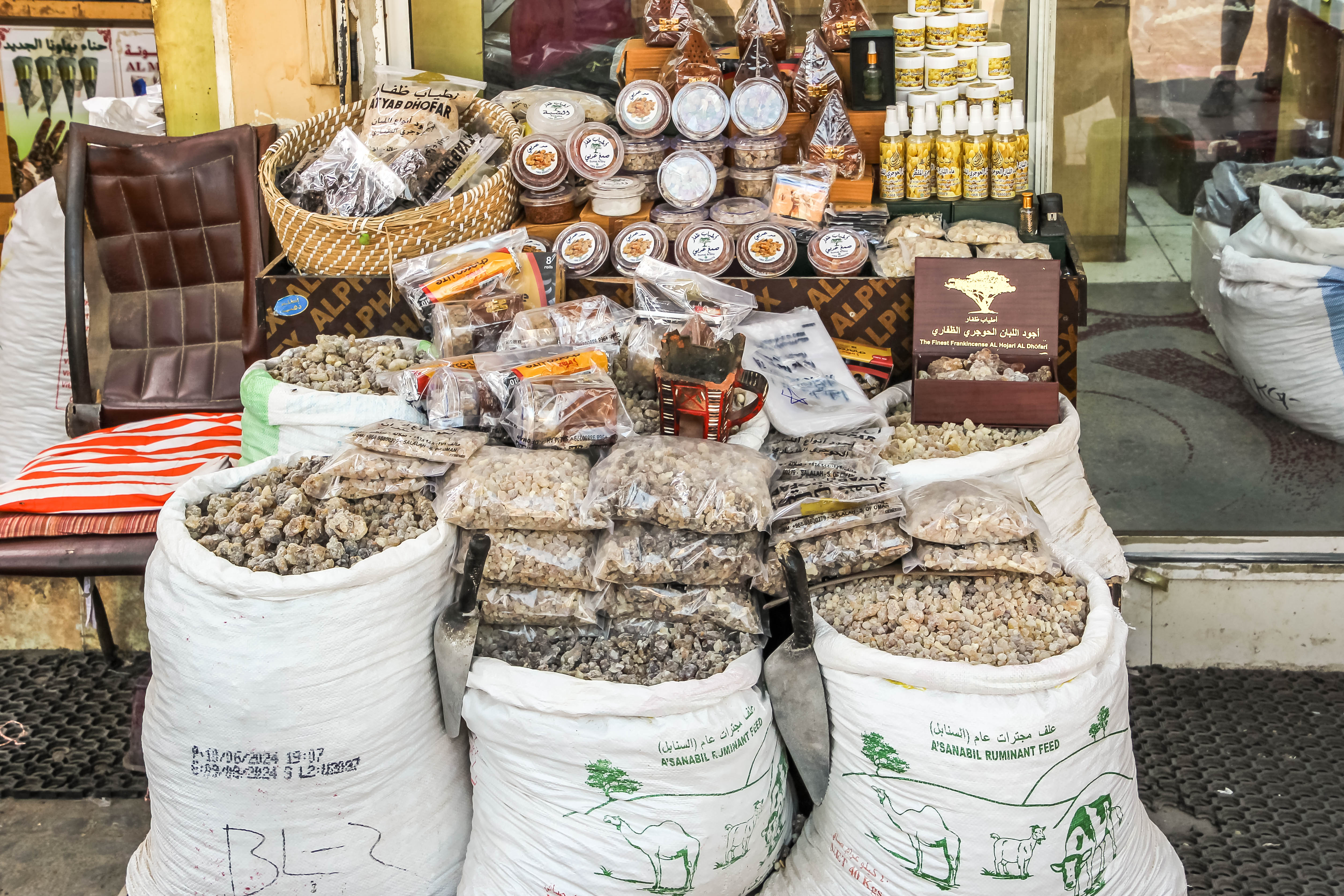
Frankincense sold in Salalah

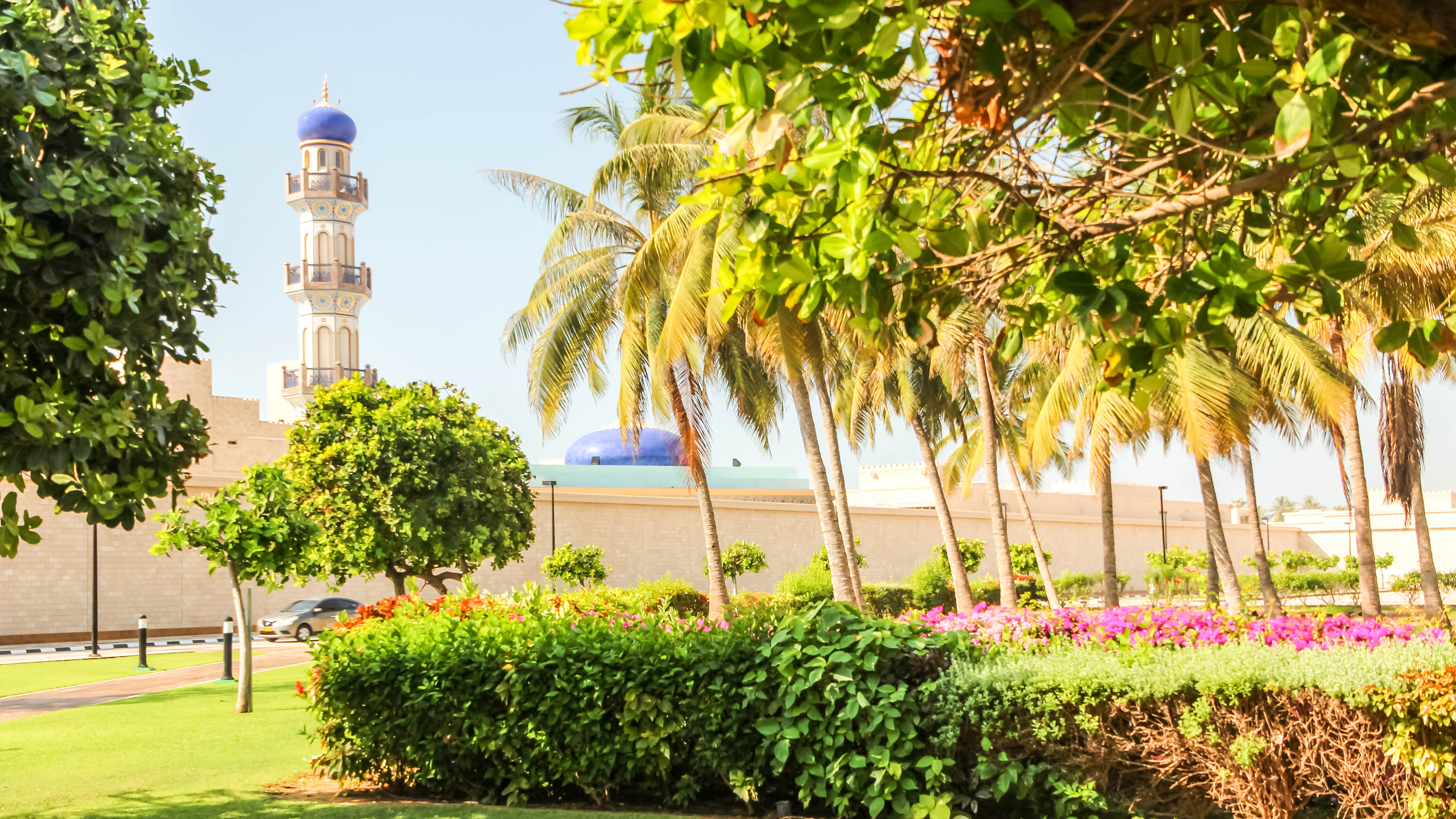
Qasr al-Hosn Palace

== See also ==
- Bountiful (Book of Mormon)#Salalah
- Duqm
- List of cities in Oman
- Museum of the Land of Frankincense
- Okkad
- Owtar
