= Job (biblical figure) =

Biblical figure

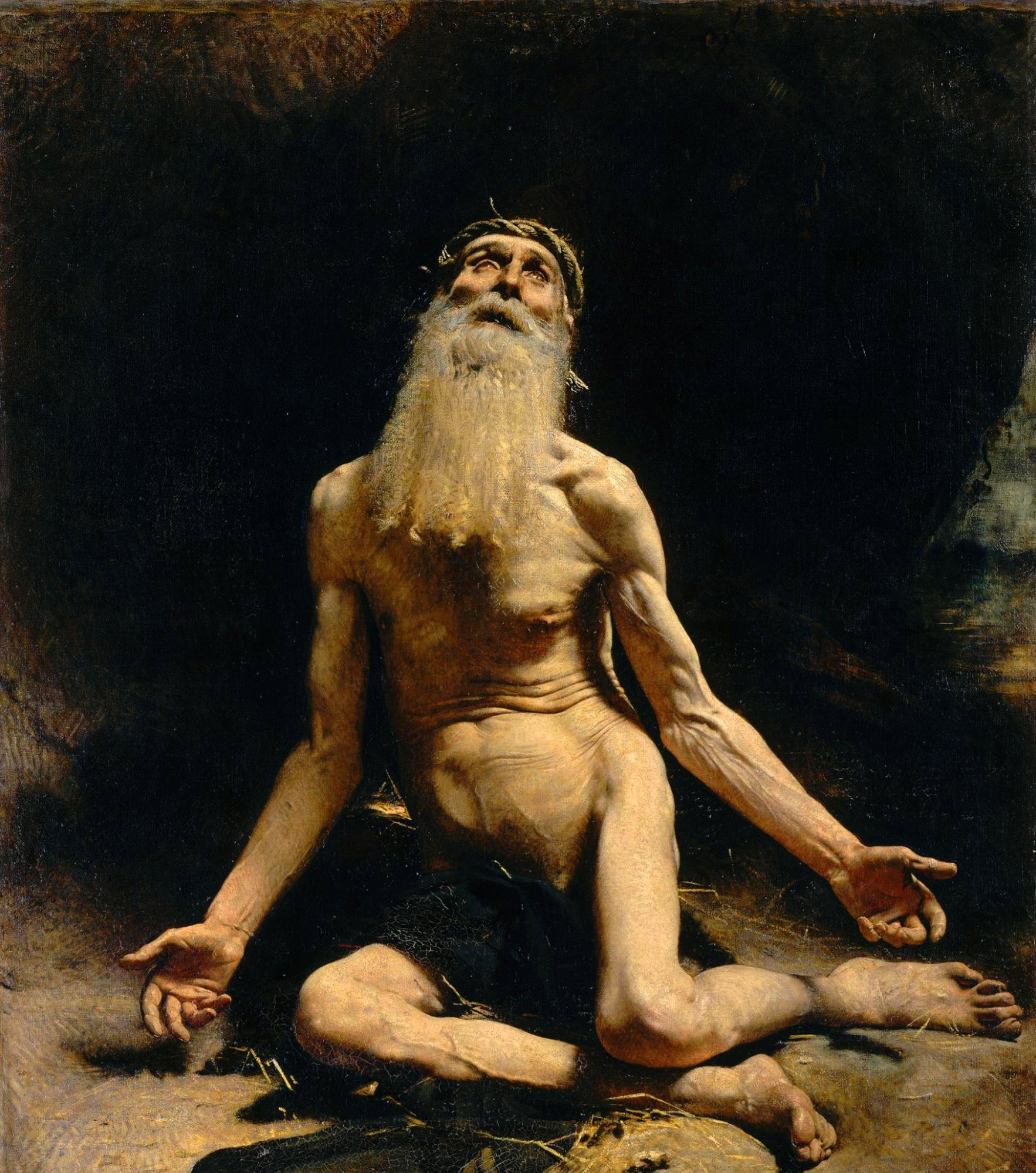
- Job by Léon Bonnat (1880)

Prophet, Righteous
- Venerated in: Judaism; Christianity; Islam; Druze; Baháʼí Faith; Rastafari
- Major shrine: Tomb of Job
- Feast: April 27 (Coptic Orthodox Church); May 6 (Eastern Orthodox Church & Armenian Apostolic Church); May 9 (Lutheran Church–Missouri Synod); May 10 (Catholic Church); August 29 (Coptic Orthodox Church); December 26 (Armenian Apostolic Church)
- Attributes: Often depicted as a man tested by God
- Patronage: Despair; sufferers of depression; lepers
- Major works: Book of Job

Job (English: /dʒoʊb/; Hebrew: אִיּוֹב 'Īyyōv; Greek: Ἰώβ Iṓb) is the central figure of the Book of Job in the Bible. In Islam, Job (Arabic: أيوب, romanized: ʾAyyūb) is also considered a prophet.

The Book of Job presents him as a family man who is beset with disasters that take away his family and possessions; this scenario is intended to test his faith in God. Job struggles to understand while reflecting on his despair. Despite this, he consistently remains devout.

The language of the Book of Job, combining post-Babylonian Hebrew and Aramaic influences, indicates it was composed during the Persian period (540–330 BCE), with the poet using Hebrew in a learned, literary manner.

== In the Hebrew Book of Job ==
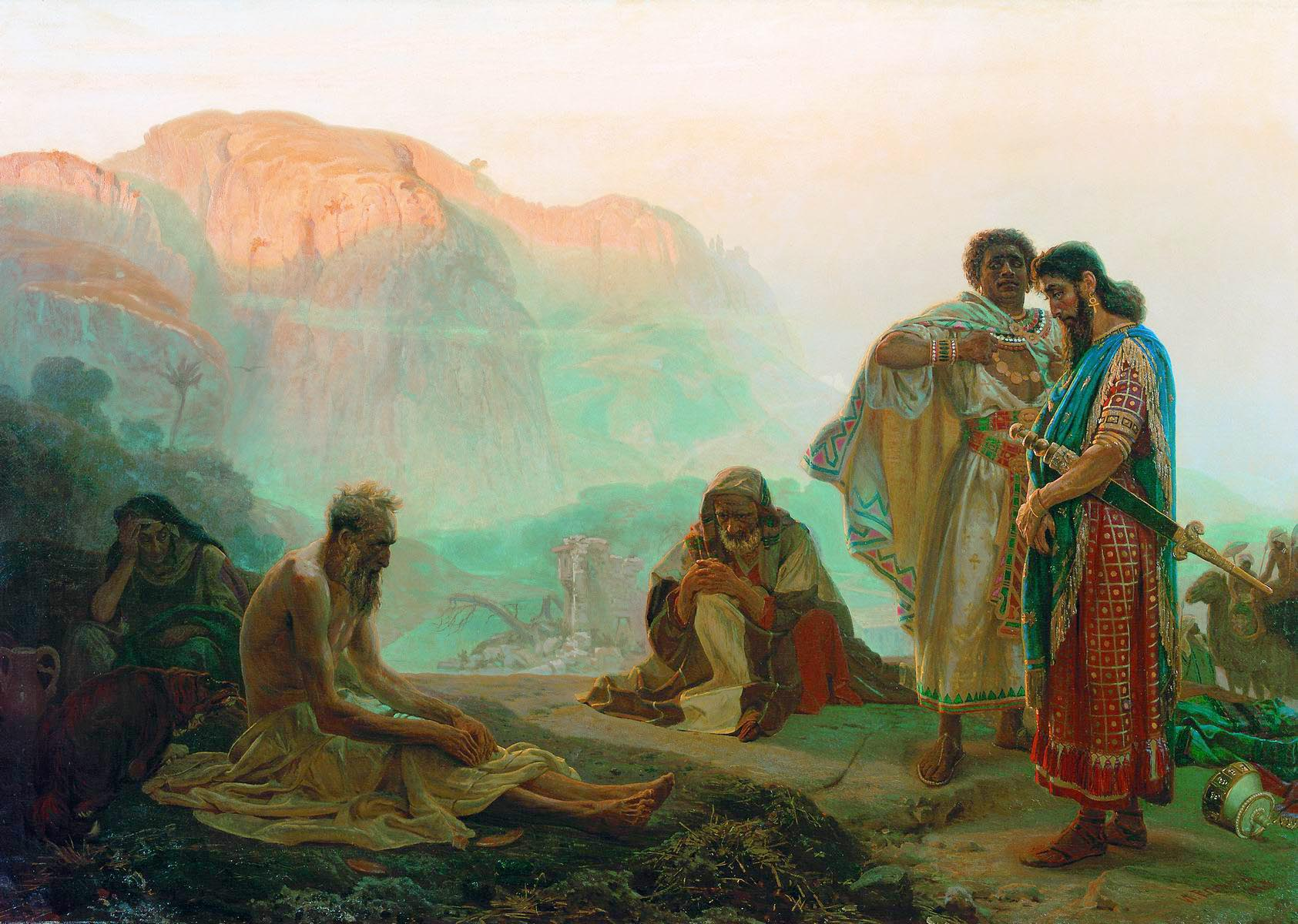
Job and His Friends by Ilya Repin (1869)

The Hebrew Book of Job is part of Ketuvim ("Writings") of the Hebrew Bible. Not much is known about Job based on the Masoretic Text.

The characters in the Book of Job consist of Job, his wife, his three friends (Bildad, Eliphaz, and Zophar), a man named Elihu, God, and angels.

It begins with an introduction to Job's character—he is described as a blessed man who lives righteously in the Land of Uz. The Lord's praise of Job prompts an angel with the title of "satan" ("Adversary") to suggest that Job served God simply because God protected him. God removes Job's protection and gives permission to the angel to take his wealth, his children, and his physical health (but not his life). Despite his difficult circumstances, he does not curse God, but rather curses the day of his birth. And although he anguishes over his plight, he stops short of accusing God of injustice. Job's miserable earthly condition is simply God's will.

In the following, Job debates with three friends concerning his condition. They argue whether it was justified, and they debate solutions to his problems. Job ultimately condemns all their counsel, beliefs, and critiques of him as false. God then appears to Job and his friends out of a whirlwind. God rebukes the three friends and gives them instruction for the remission of sin, followed by Job being restored to an even better condition than his former wealthy state (Job 42:10–17). Job is blessed to have seven sons, as well as three daughters, named Jemimah (which means "dove"), Keziah ("cinnamon"), and Keren-happuch ("horn of eye-makeup"). His daughters were said to be the most beautiful women in the land.

== In the Greek Old Testament Book of Job ==
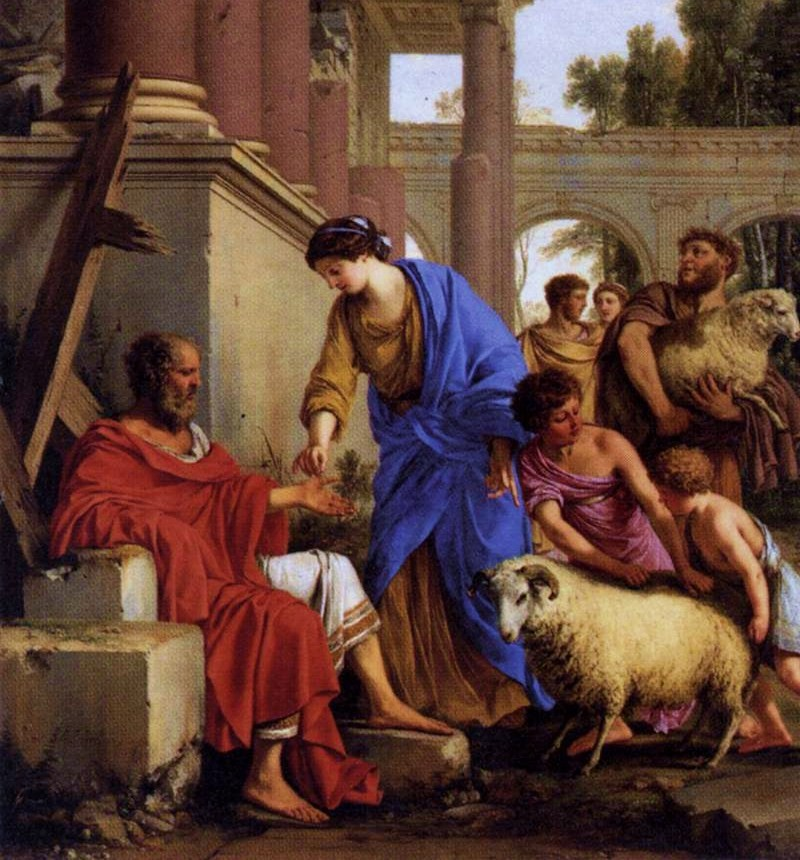
Job Restored to Prosperity by Laurent de La Hyre (1648)

The Septuagint, an ancient Greek translation of the Hebrew Old Testament, has a revised and updated final verse that claims Job's genealogy, asserting him to be a grandson of Esau and a ruler of Edom.

This man is described by the Syriac book as dwelling in the land of Uz, on the borders of Edom and Arabia. And his name before was Jobab. And having taken an Arabian wife, he fathered a son, whose name was Enan. And he himself had as father Zareh, from the sons of Esau. And his mother was Bosorra, so that it made him the fifth from Abraham. And these were the kings who were ruling in Edom, which territory also he himself ruled over: first, Bela, the son of Beor, and the name of his city was Dinhabah. And after Bela, Jobab, who was called Job. And after this, Husham, who was serving as leader from the territories of Thaiman. And after this. Hadad, son of Bered, who destroyed Midian in the field of Moab, and the name of his city was Avith. And his friends who came to him were Eliphaz, of the sons of Esau, king of the Temanites; Bildad, the tyrant of the Shuhites; and Zophar, the king of the Naamathites.

== In other religious texts ==
=== Judaism ===
- He is mentioned in the Book of Ezekiel.
- He is cited as someone "who held fast to all the ways of justice" in the deuterocanonical Book of Sirach.

=== Christianity ===
- He is praised for his perseverance in the Christian Epistle of James.
- He is the protagonist of a pseudepigraphal book called the Testament of Job.

=== Mormonism ===
- He is mentioned in the Doctrine and Covenants, one of the four sacred texts of the Church of Jesus Christ of Latter-day Saints (LDS Church).

=== Islam ===
- He is discussed as a prophet in the Quran by the name of Ayūb.

The Quran describes Job as a righteous servant of Allah, who was afflicted by suffering for a lengthy period of time. However, it clearly states that Job never lost faith in God and forever called to God in prayer, asking Him to remove his affliction:

And [mention] Job, when he called to his Lord, "Indeed, adversity has touched me, and you are the Most Merciful of the merciful."

— Quran, sura 21 (The Prophets), ayah 83 The Quran, sura 21, verse 83

=== Baháʼí ===
- In the writings of the Baháʼí Faith: A lengthy tablet was written by Bahá'u'lláh, the first part of which is focused on Job. The Tablet is often referred to as the Tablet of Patience or the Tablet of Job.

== Job in Judaism ==
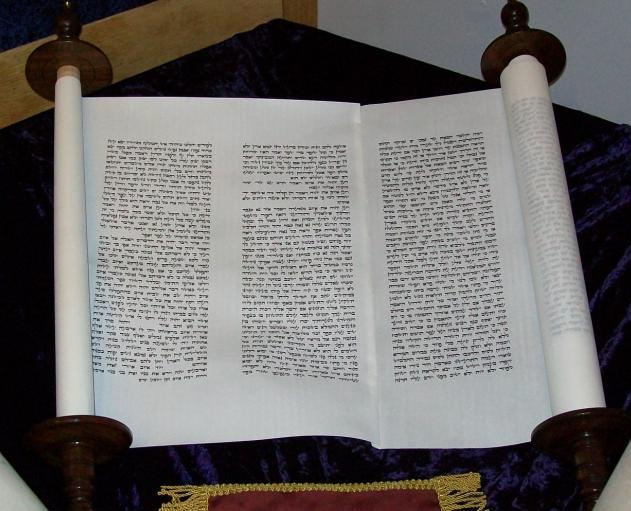
Scroll of Book of Job, in Hebrew

A clear majority of rabbis saw Job as having in fact existed as a historically factual figure.

According to a minority view, Job never existed. In this view, Job was a literary creation by a prophet who used this form of writing to convey a divine message. On the other hand, the Talmud (in Tractate Baba Batra 15a–16b) goes to great lengths trying to ascertain when Job actually lived, citing many opinions and interpretations by the leading sages.

Job is further mentioned in the Talmud as follows:

- Job's resignation to his fate.
- When Job was prosperous, anyone who associated with him even to buy from him or sell to him, was blessed.
- Job's reward for being generous.
- David, Job and Ezekiel described the Torah's length without putting a number to it.
- Job was in fact one of three advisors that Pharaoh consulted, prior to taking action against the increasingly multiplying Israelites in the Book of Exodus. As described in the Talmud: Balaam urged Pharaoh to kill the Hebrew new-born boys; Jethro opposed this decree; and Job, though personally opposed to the decree, kept silent and did not protest it. It is for Job's silence that God subsequently punishes him with his bitter afflictions. However, the Book of Job itself contains no indication of this, and to the prophet Ezekiel, Yahweh refers to Job as a righteous man of the same calibre as Noah and Daniel.

== Christian views ==
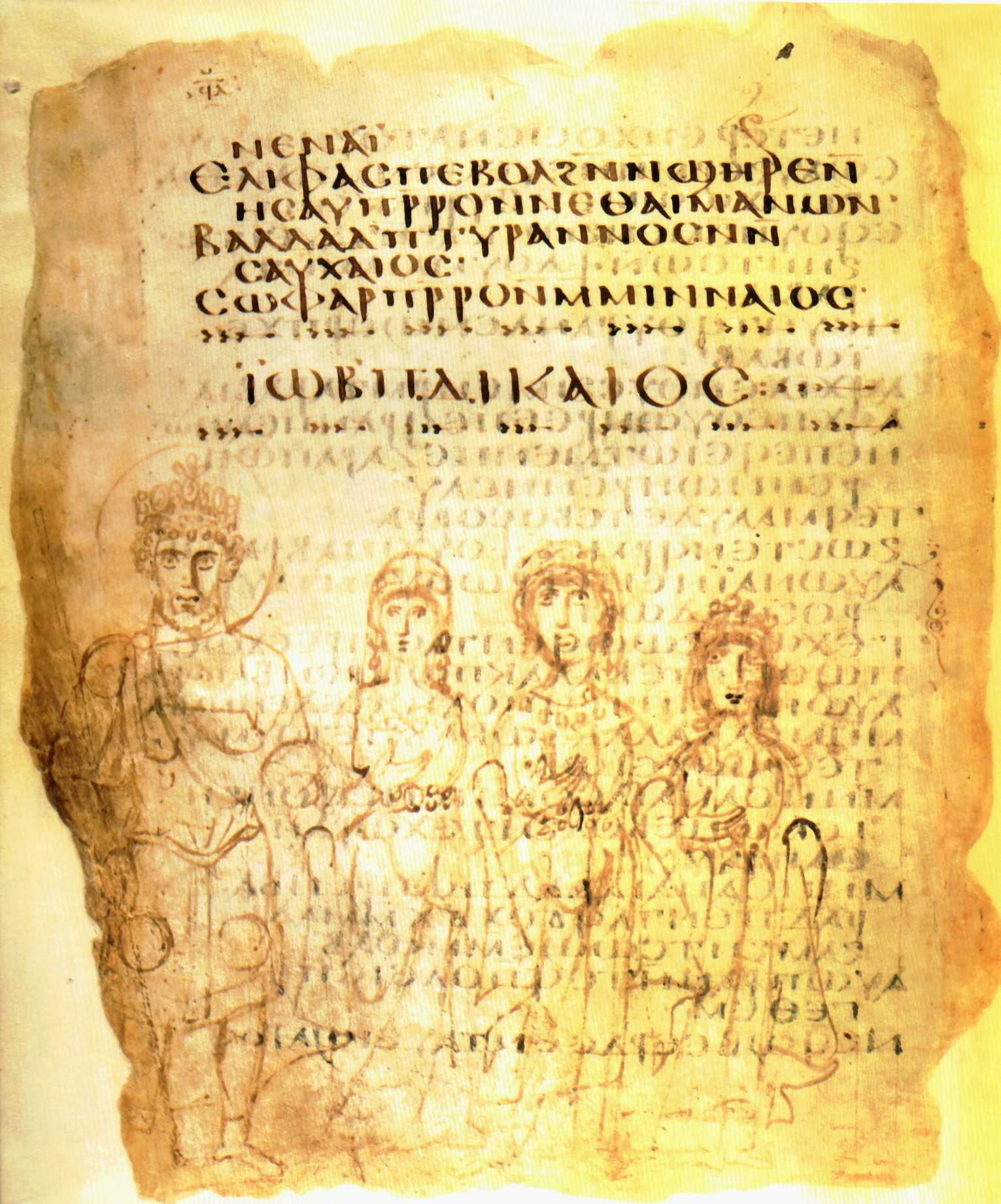
Job and his daughters in MS I B 18 (Coptic, 5th century AD). Unusually, Job is depicted as a royal figure, wearing a crown and short tunic. His daughters wear tunics with jewels and diadems.

Christianity accepts the Book of Job as canon in its Old Testament. In addition, Job is mentioned in the New Testament of the Christian Bible: the Epistle of James (James 5:11) paraphrases Job as an example of patience in suffering.

Job's declaration, "I know that my redeemer lives, and that in the end he will stand on the earth" (Job 19:25, Heb. ואני ידעתי גאלי חי ואחרון על עפר יקום wa'ănî yāḏa'tî gō'ălî ḥāy; wə-'aḥărōn, 'al-'āp̄ār yāqūm), is considered by some Christians to be a proto-Christian reference to Christ as the Redeemer, and is the basis of several Christian hymns, as well as the opening scene of Part III of Handel's Messiah. Jewish biblical commentators and scholars contest this by stating that Job "insists on a divine hearing in his lifetime" (cf. Job 16:19–22).

=== Feast Days ===
He is commemorated by the Lutheran Church–Missouri Synod in their Calendar of Saints on May 9, by the Roman Catholic Church on May 10, and by the Eastern Orthodox and Byzantine Catholic churches on May 6.

He is also commemorated by the Armenian Apostolic Church on May 6 and December 26, and by the Coptic Orthodox Church on April 27 and August 29. The Armenian Apostolic Church commemorates Job along with John the Baptist on the Thursday after the third Sunday of the Feast of the Assumption.

=== Job in the reported visions of Anne Catherine Emmerich ===
In the account of the reported visions of the German Catholic mystic Anne Catherine Emmerich, published in The Life of Jesus Christ and Biblical Revelations, Job is described as an ancient patriarch who lived in the period following the dispersion associated with the Tower of Babel. The account places his family north of the Black Sea, near a mountain range, and identifies him as an ancestor of Abraham.

Emmerich's account identifies Job's father as Joktan, son of Heber (Eber), and describes him as a great chieftain who lived around the time of the dispersion associated with the Tower of Babel. In her account of the Tower of Babel, Emmerich states that God set Heber and his descendants apart as a holy nation because they had refrained from participating in the construction of the tower. She further relates that God gave Heber a new and holy language, described as "the pure Hebrew, or Chaldaic", so that his descendants would be distinguished from other nations. Job is described as the youngest of thirteen brothers. The account states that Joktan had a brother, Peleg, whose descendants included Abraham's ancestors, and that the tribes descended from the two brothers generally intermarried. Job's wife is identified as belonging to the tribe of Peleg. Through his descendants and subsequent marriages, Job is said to have become an ancestor of Abraham's mother.

The account portrays Job as religiously distinct from his family and the surrounding peoples. It states that he could not remain in his parents' household because his ideas and inclinations differed from theirs. While the surrounding nations worshipped images of animals, Job worshipped the one true God, whom he contemplated through the created world, particularly the stars and the changing light between night and day. He fashioned a representation of God depicting a figure with rays around its head and a globe bearing a vessel upon the waves, which Emmerich associated with the Deluge. Job prayed before this representation and offered grain as a sacrifice.

The narrative places Job in several geographical settings. After an initial period in his homeland, he moved further into the Caucasus region, where he established a new settlement. He subsequently travelled to Egypt with a large retinue to accompany a female relative who was to marry the son of one of the shepherd kings, identified in the account with the Hyksos, who ruled part of Egypt. The account describes Job's residence at Matarea, where he was troubled by Egyptian idolatry and human sacrifice. It further associates the area with the site later known as the Fountain of Mary and describes Job receiving visions concerning human salvation and the trials awaiting him.

According to the account, Job experienced three periods of affliction in different places. It describes intervals of prosperity between his trials, giving periods of nine years between the first and second afflictions, seven years between the second and third, and twelve years following the third. His final affliction is placed in a region east of Jericho, where he was subsequently restored to prosperity. The narrative also identifies Job as an ancestor of the Davidic line.

Emmerich's account gives an explanation for the transmission and later composition of the Book of Job. It states that two trusted servants of Job, named Hai and Uis (or Ois), recorded his history and dialogues with God on bark, from his dictation. These writings were reportedly preserved by his descendants and transmitted through successive generations until the time of Abraham. The account further states that the traditions were used for instruction in the school of Rebecca and were passed through Jacob and Joseph to the Israelites in Egypt. Moses is said to have collected and rearranged the material for the Israelites, while Solomon subsequently remodelled it, omitting some material and adding other material of his own. Emmerich's account therefore describes the resulting book as containing the wisdom of Job, Moses and Solomon.

The account also proposes that the names of persons, cities and nations in the original history were subsequently adapted to geographical names familiar in Canaan. It suggests that this contributed to Job's later identification as an Edomite, since the place of his final residence was inhabited by Edomites after his death.

In another reported vision concerning Job's trials, Emmerich interpreted the biblical expression "while he was yet speaking" (Job 1:16–18) as referring to the arrival of another calamity while news of the preceding misfortune was still being discussed among the people, rather than necessarily indicating that the events followed one another immediately.

== Islamic views and Quranic account ==
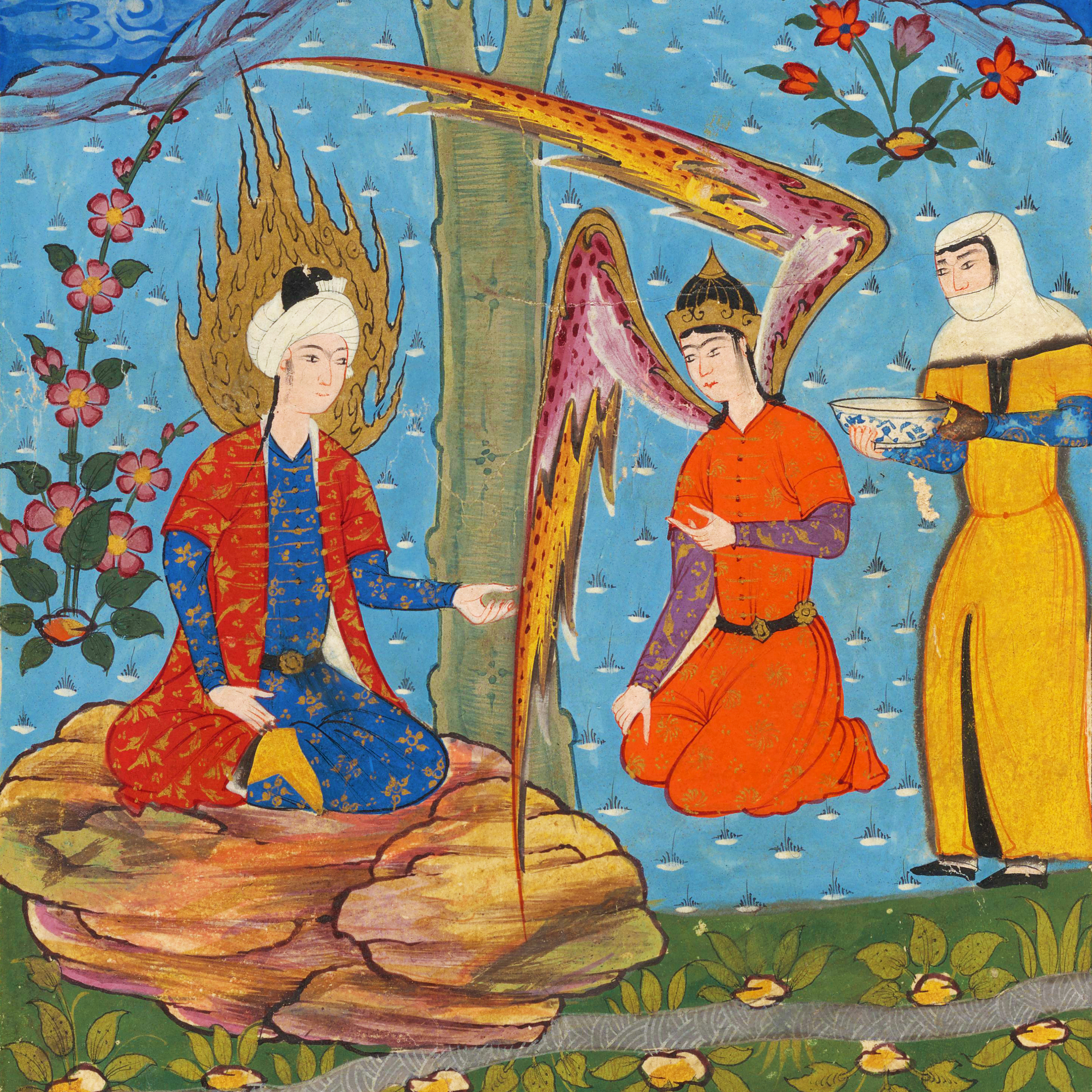
Islamic miniature of Ayub speaking with the angel Jibril, set to lift his afflictions.

In the Qur'an, Job (Arabic: أيّوب, romanized: Ayyūb) is considered a prophet in Islam. The narrative frame of Job's story in Islam is similar to the Hebrew Bible story but, in Islam, the emphasis is paid to Job remaining steadfast to God and there is no record of his despair, or mention of discussions with friends. Some Muslim commentators also spoke of Job as being the ancestor of the Romans. Muslim literature also comments on Job's time and place of prophecy, saying that he came after Joseph in the prophetic series and that he preached to his own people rather than being sent to a specified community. Tradition further recounts that Job will be the leader of the group of "those who patiently endured" in Heaven.

== Local traditions regarding Job ==
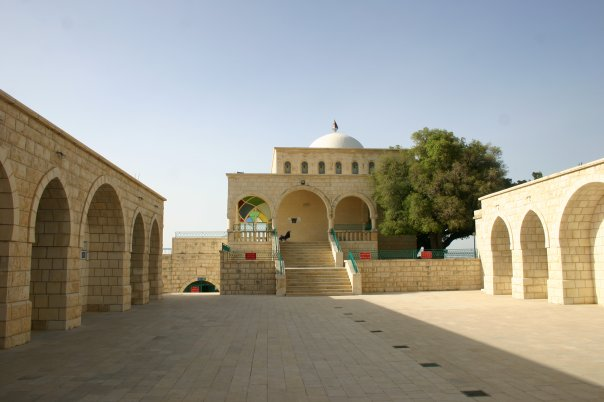
An outer view of the Druze shrine of Prophet Job in Niha village, Lebanon

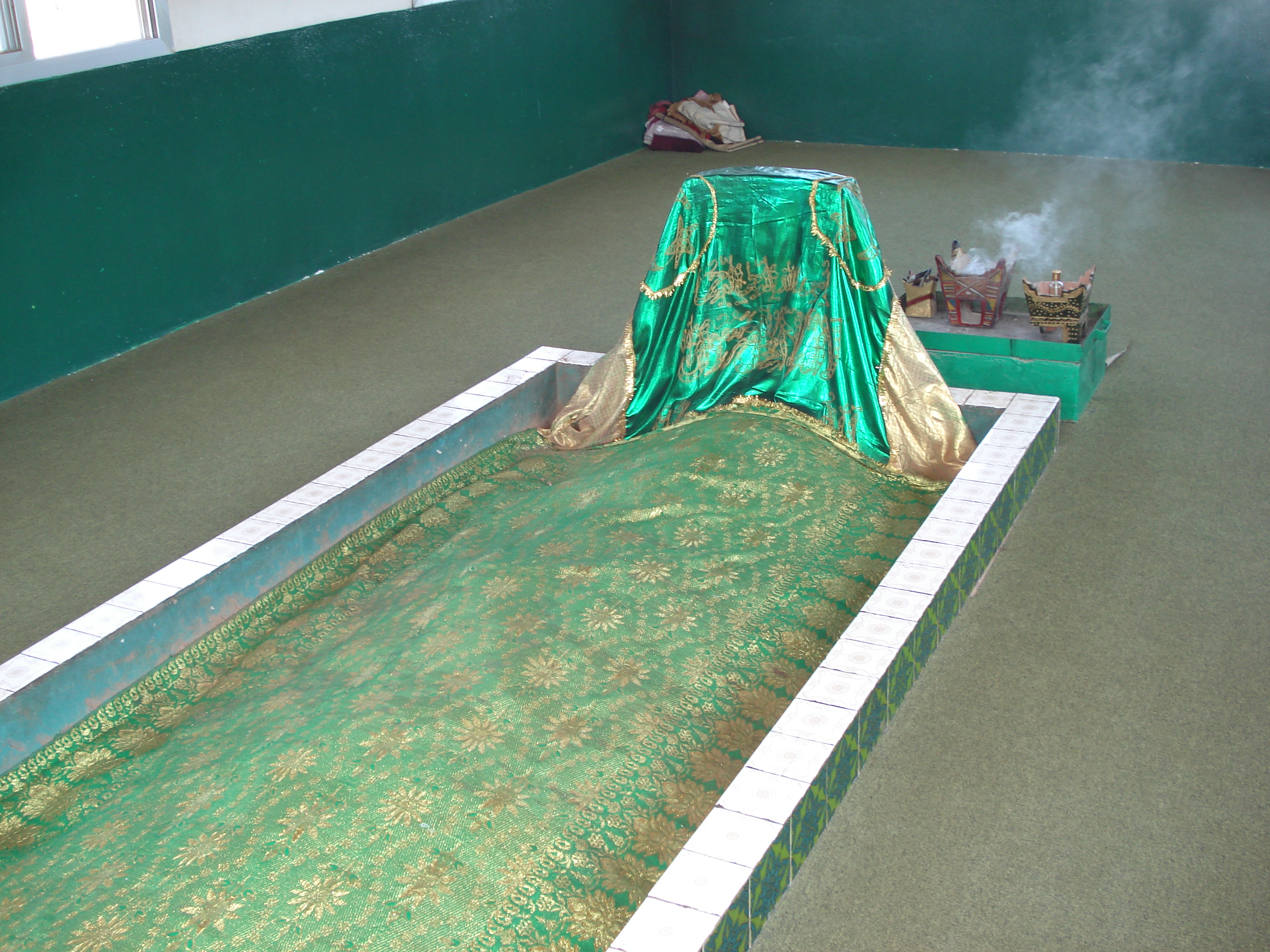
The tomb of Job, outside Salalah, Oman

There are at least two locations that claim to be the place of Job's ordeal, and at least three that claim to have his tomb.

The Eyüp Sultan Mosque in Istanbul, Turkey, holds the tomb of Abu Ayyub al-Ansari, a companion of Muhammad, not the biblical/Qur'anic Job (Ayyub in Arabic, Eyüp in Turkish). The covered cave in the southeastern Turkish province of Urfa is one of the claimants.

=== Palestine ===
In Palestinian folk tradition, Job's place of trial is Al-Jura, or Al-Joura, a village outside the town of Al-Majdal (today's Ashkelon, Israel). It was there God rewarded him with a fountain of youth that removed whatever illnesses he had, and gave him back his youth.

To the northwest of the depopulated Palestinian village of Dayr Ayyub is an area which, according to the village belief, contained the tomb of the prophet Ayyub, the biblical Job.

In the area of Tabgha (Greek: Heptapegon), on the shore of the Sea of Galilee, a few sites are associated by local tradition with the life of Ayyub. A small grotto near the base of what is known to Christians as the Mount of Beatitudes, or Mount Eremos, is known as Mghraret Ayub ("Job's Cave"). Two of the towers built in the Byzantine period to collect the water of the Heptapegon springs are named in Arabic Tannur Ayub ("Job's Kiln") and Hammam Ayyub ("Job's Bath"). Hammam Ayyub was initially called "the Leper's Bath", but the leper was later identified with Job; the nearby spring, now a waterfall, is known as Ain Ayub, "Job's Spring".

=== Hauran, Syria ===
The town of al-Shaykh Saad in the Hauran region in Syria has been associated with Job since at least the 4th-century AD. Karnein was mentioned in Eusebius' Onomasticon as a town of Bashan that was said to be the location of the house of Job. Egeria the pilgrim relates that a church was built over the place in March or February 384 AD, and that the place was known as the "town of Job", or "civitas Job". According to Egeria's account the body of Job was laid in a stone coffin below the altar. According to tradition, Hammam Ayyub is a fountain in the town where Job washed himself when he was sick, and is reputed to have healing powers. Another holy artifact in the town is the "Rock of Job", known in local folklore as the place where he sat when he was afflicted with the disease.

=== Urfa, Turkey ===
The city of Urfa (ancient Adma', later Edessa) in the Şanlıurfa Province, or Harran region of southeastern Turkey, also claims to be the location at which Job underwent his ordeal in a cave. The venue boasts an Ottoman-style mosque and madrasa that runs as shops today. A well exists within the complex, said to be the one formed when he struck the ground with his foot as described in the Quran. The water is considered to be miraculously curing. The whole complex underwent recent restoration. The actual tomb of Job is located outside the city of Urfa.

=== Oman ===
The Tomb of Job is also said to be situated in Jabal Qarah outside the city of Salalah in southern Oman.

=== El-Chouf mountains, Lebanon ===
Additionally, the Druze community also maintains a shrine for the Prophet Job in Niha village in the Chouf mountains of Lebanon. This shrine is said to be the place where Job was healed from his ailments after his wife carried his frail body up the steep mountain in a basket so he dies up there. Instead, he was healed and given an even larger wealth.

=== Ayodhya, India ===
In a 16th-century Mughal document, Ain-i-Akbari, there is mention of a tomb, in Ayodhya, commonly believed to be the resting place of the Prophet Job. The tomb of the Prophet Job in Ayodhya is also mentioned in the work India of Aurangzeb of Jadunath Sarkar.

== Gallery ==
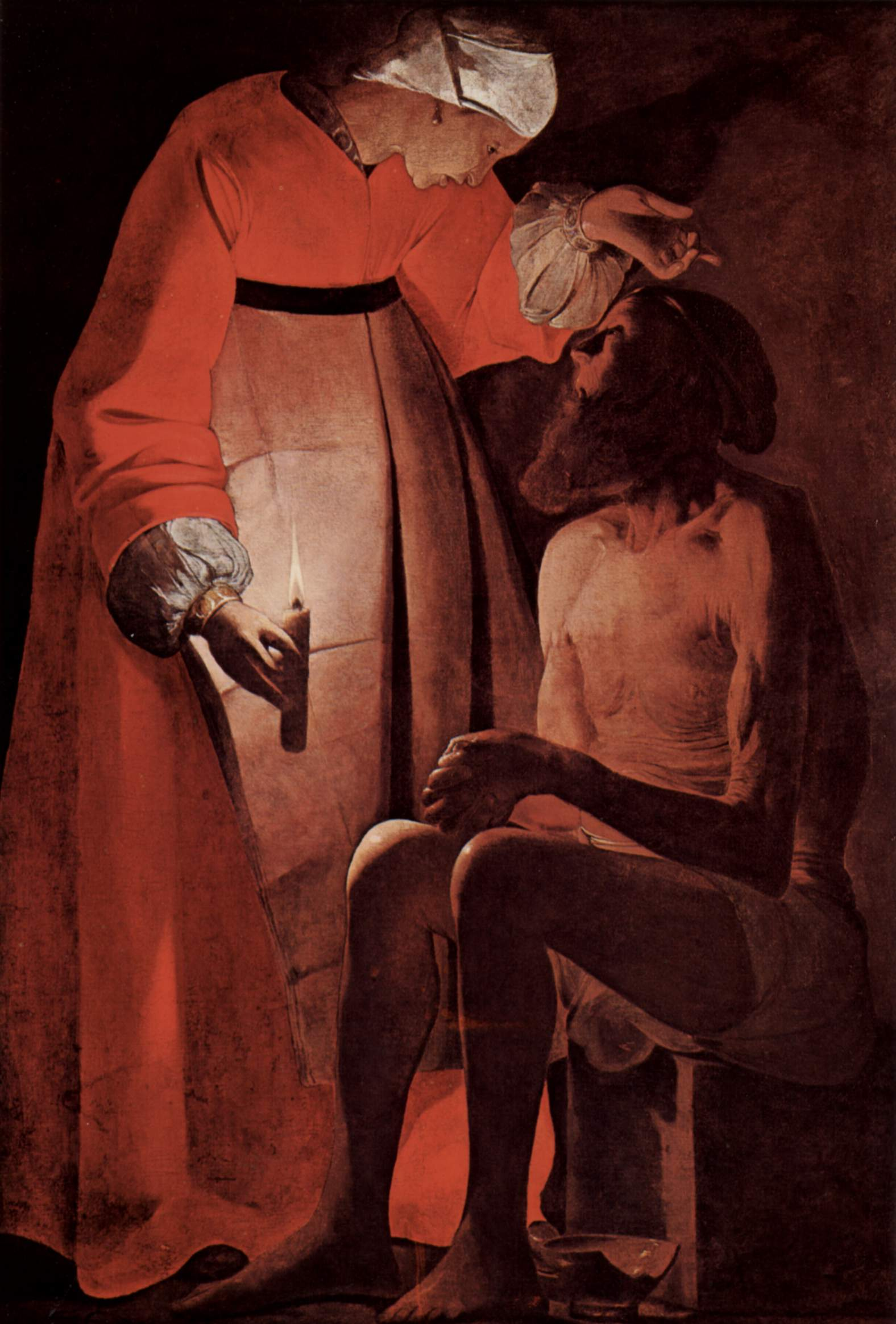
Job speaking to his wife, as depicted by Georges de La Tour

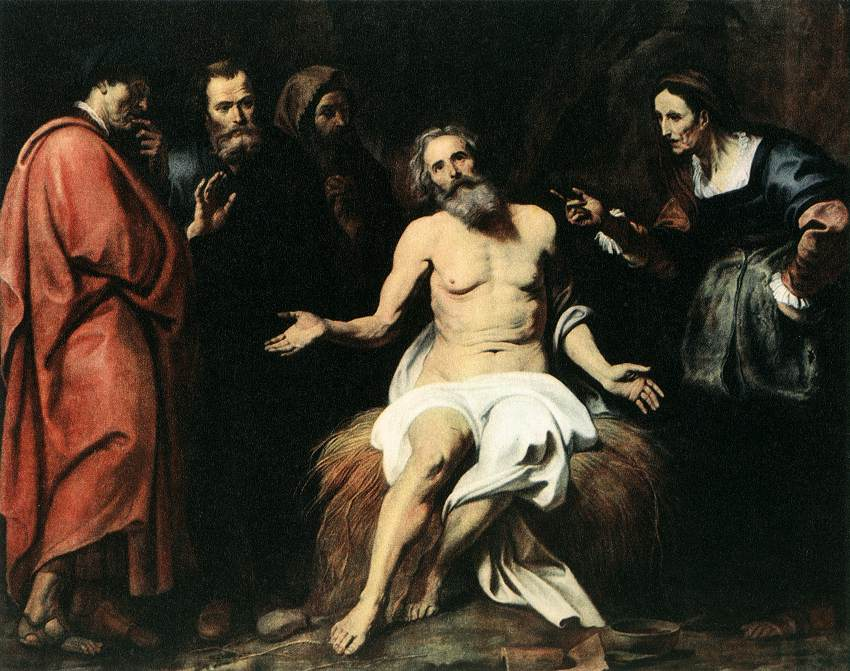
Job with his friends by Gerard Seghers

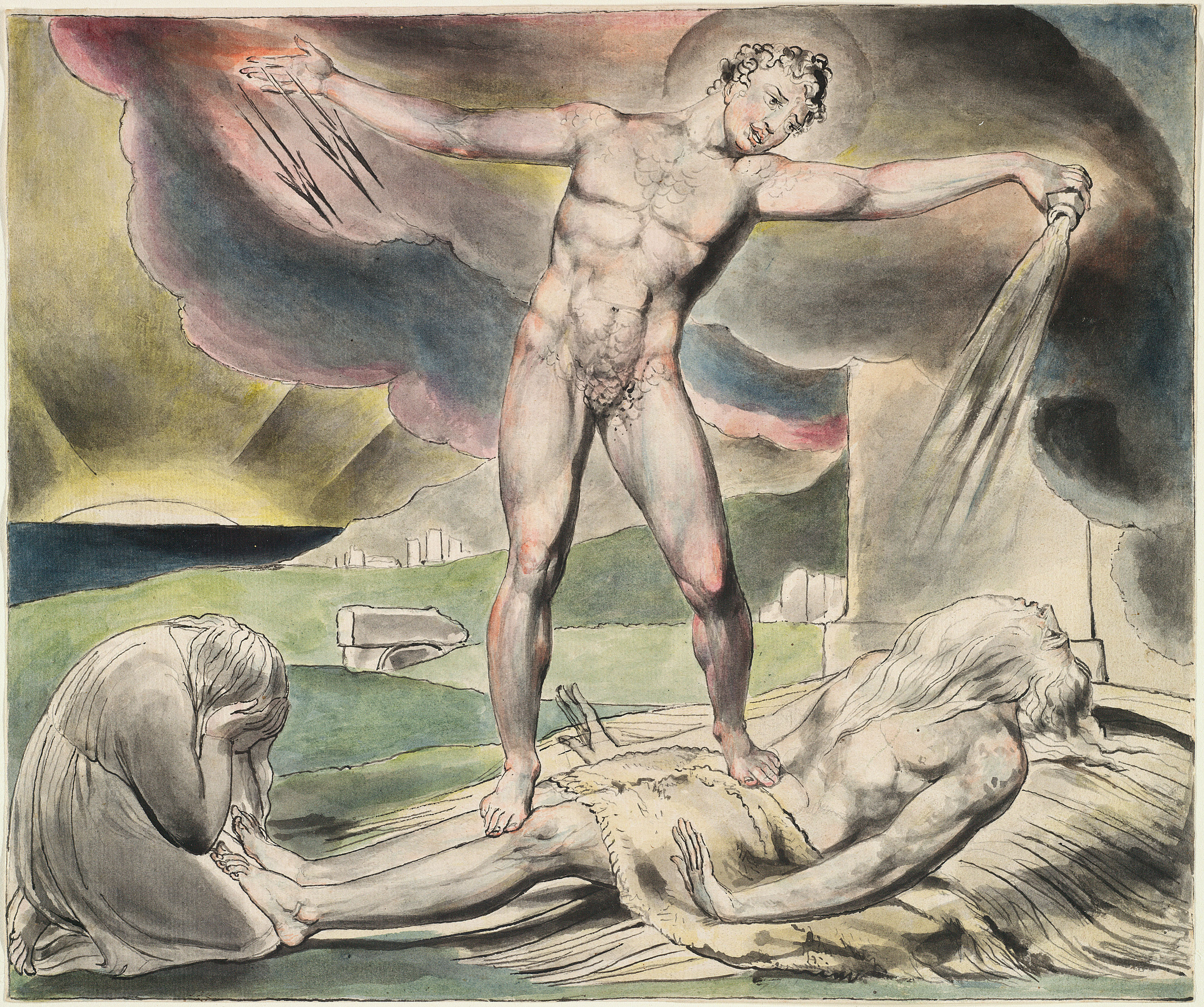
The examination of Job, Satan pours on the plagues of Job, by William Blake

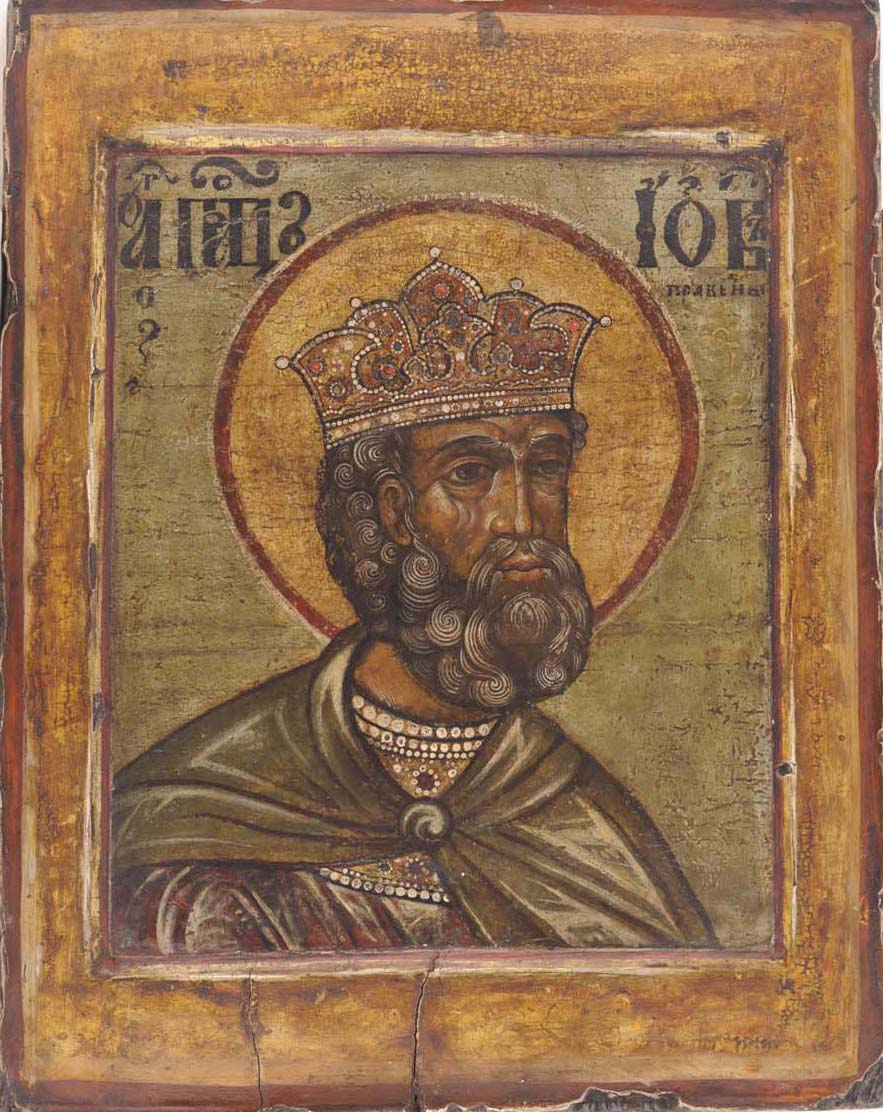
Venerable Job, 17. century Northern Russia

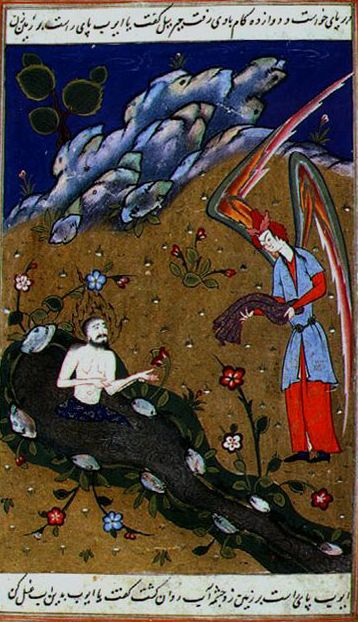
Job in the curing water, from a Persian illuminated manuscript version of Stories of the Prophets

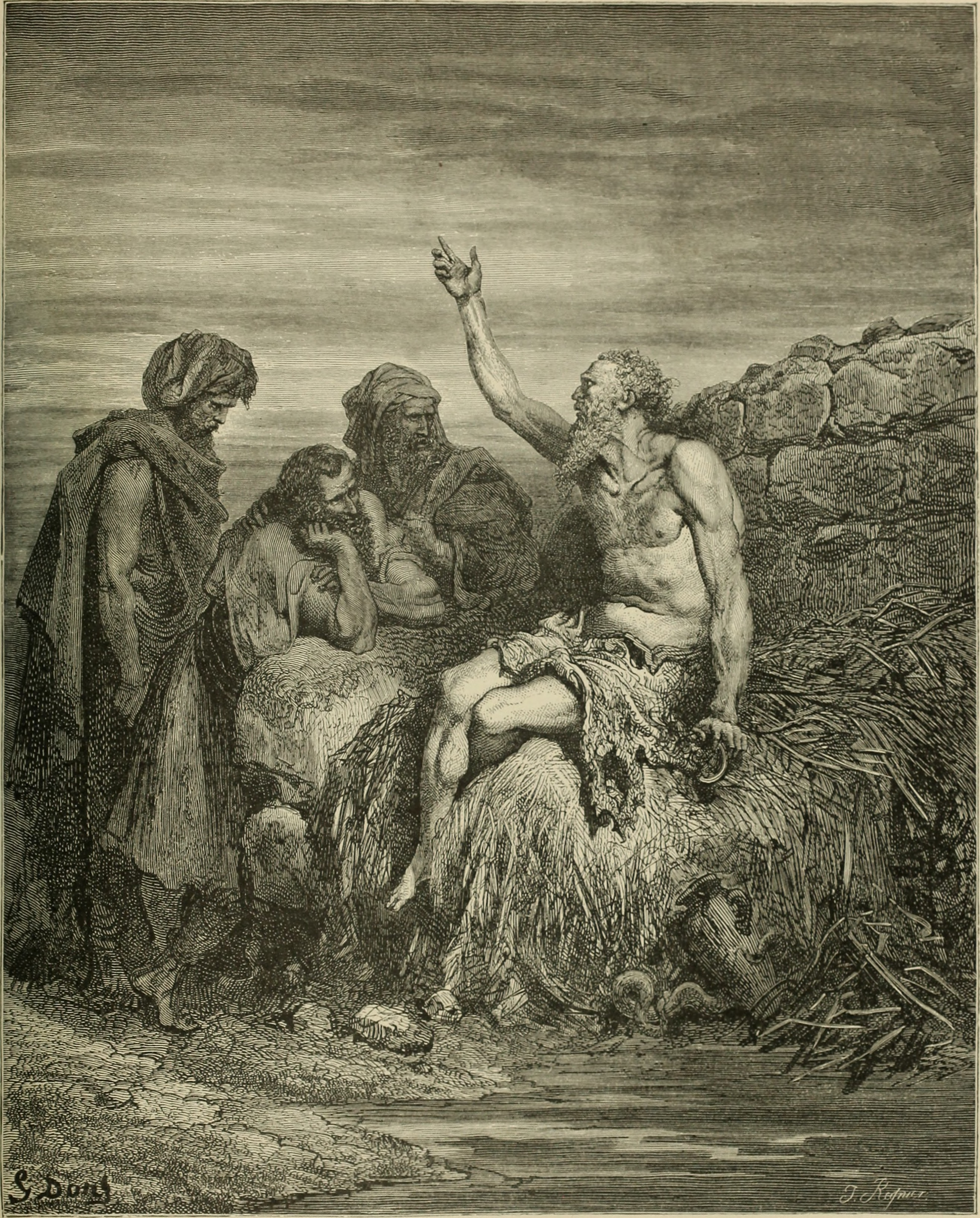
"Job and His Friends", one of Gustave Doré's illustrations for La Grande Bible de Tours

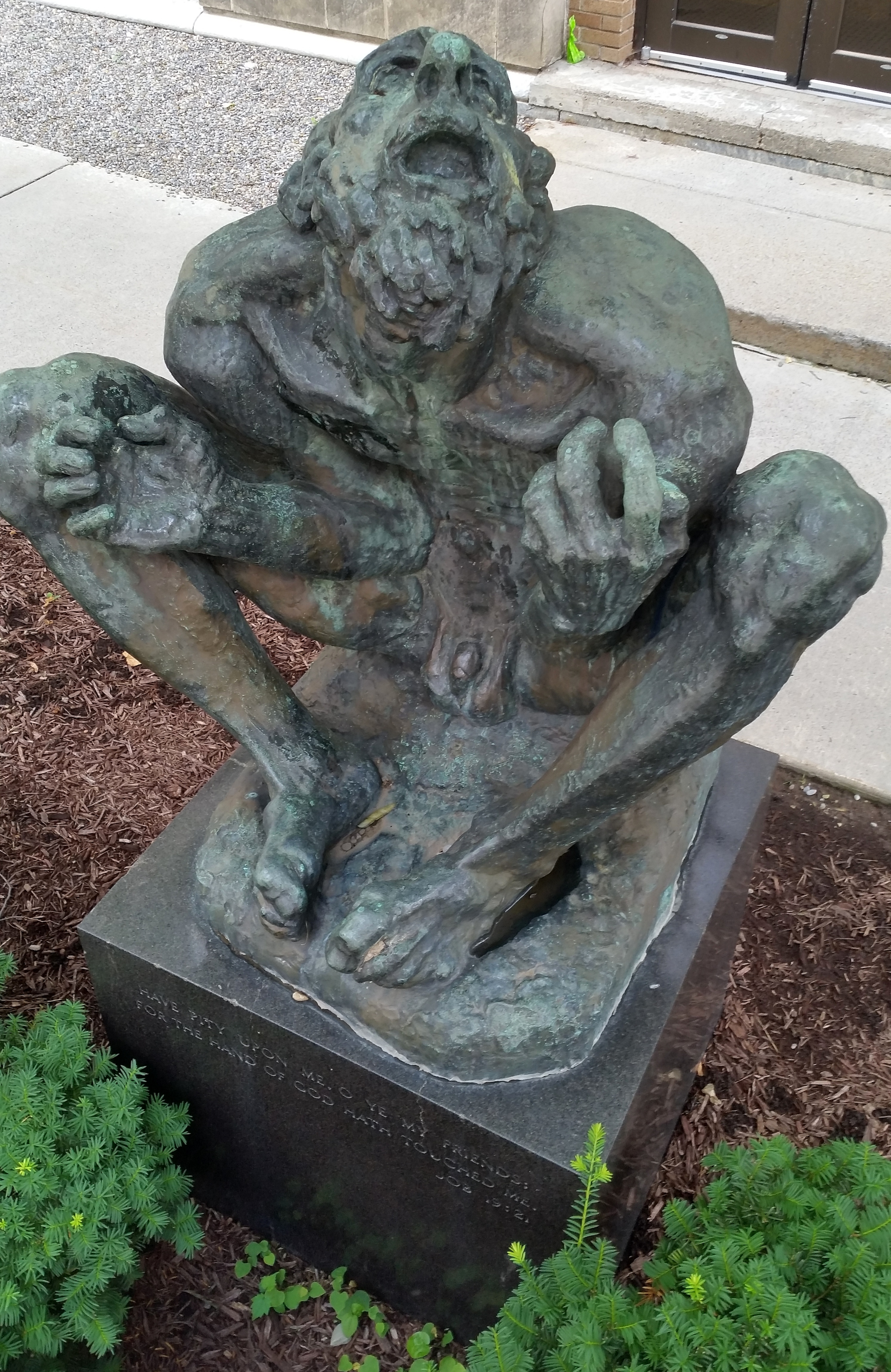
"Job" (bronze, 1945), by Ivan Meštrović. Installed at Syracuse University, Syracuse, New York.

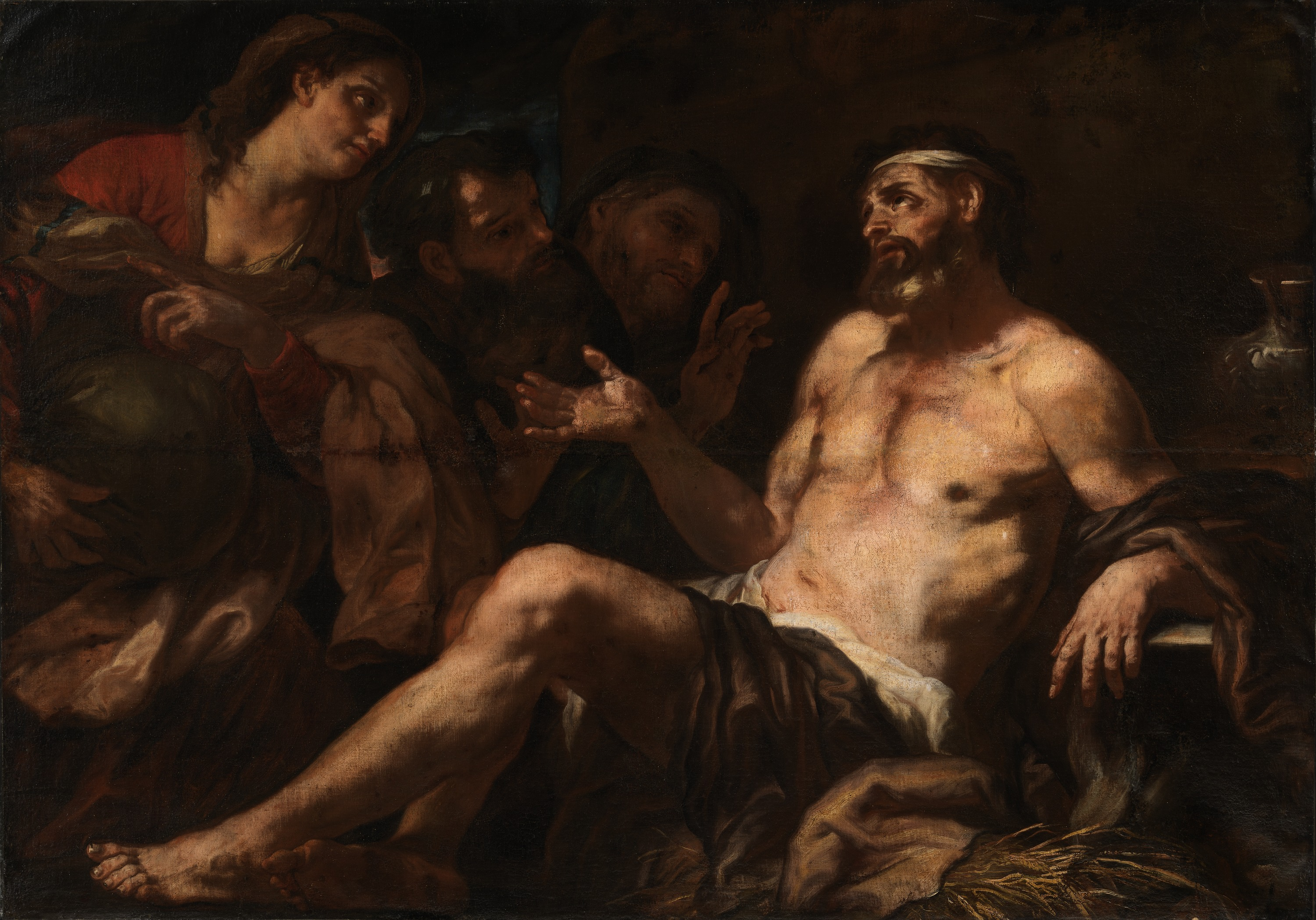
Job and His Comforters, Luca Giordano c. 1700

== See also ==
- Behemoth
- Biblical and Quranic narratives
- Book of Job in Byzantine illuminated manuscripts
- Jobab ben Zerah
- Prophets of Islam
- Stories of The Prophets
- Testament of Job
