= Keren-happuch =

Daughter of Job, named in the Bible (Book of Job)

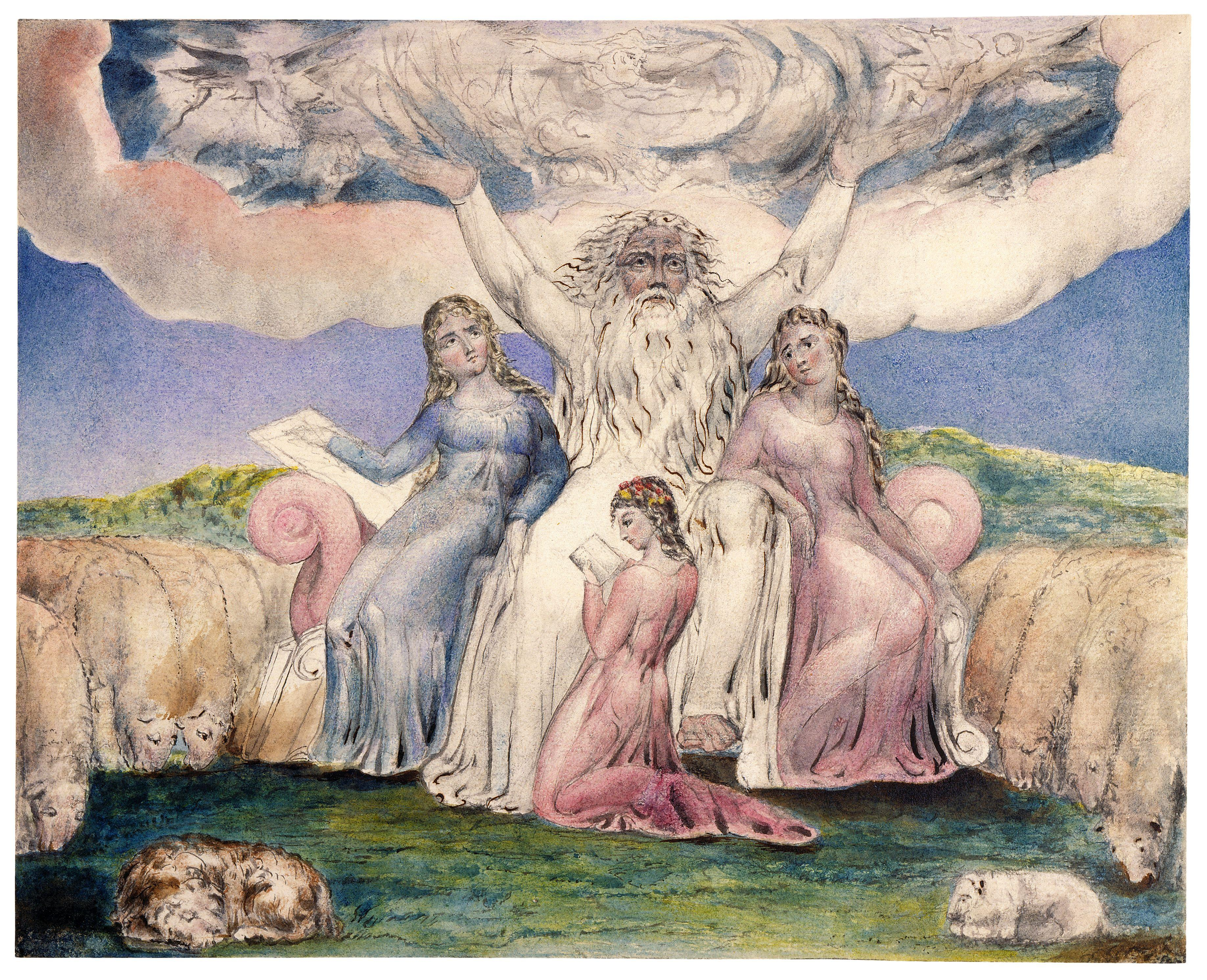
Job with his three daughters by William Blake

Keren-happuch (Hebrew: קֶרֶן הַפּוּךְ Qeren Hapūḵ, Hebrew pronunciation: [ˈqeren hapˈpux], "Horn of kohl") was the youngest of the three beautiful daughters of Job, named in the Bible as given to him in the later part of his life, after God made Job prosperous again. Keren-happuch's older sisters are named as Jemima and Keziah (Job 42:14). Job's sons, in contrast, are not named.

Keren-happuch, along with her sisters, was described as more beautiful than all the other women in the land. Also, unusually and in common with her sisters, Keren-happuch was granted an inheritance by her father, with her brothers as might have been expected (Job 42:15). Apart from these brief references at the end of the Book of Job, she is not mentioned elsewhere in the Bible.

Peter Bloomfield suggests that the beauty of his daughters "underscores Job's complete recovery. Job had been a very sick man but you would never know it by looking at his daughters."
