= Jemima (Bible) =

Eldest daughter of Job in the Bible

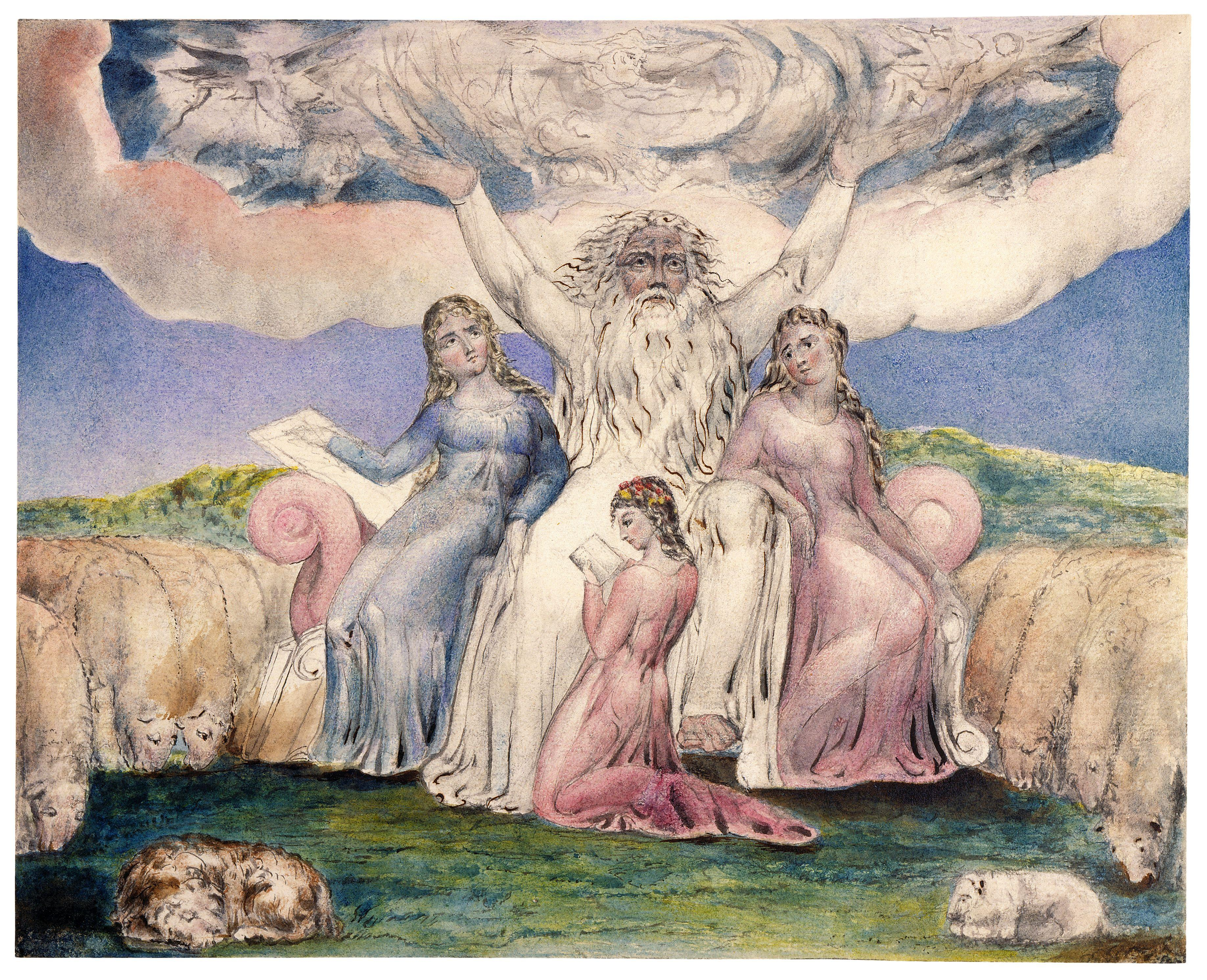
Job with his three daughters by William Blake

Jemimah or Jemima (/dʒəˈmaɪmə/ jə-MY-mə; Hebrew: יְמִימָה, romanized: Yəmīmā) was the oldest of the three beautiful daughters of Job, named in the Bible as given to him in the later part of his life, after God made Job prosperous again. Jemimah's sisters are named Keziah and Keren-Happuch. Job's sons, in contrast, are not named.

Job's social status lowered significantly as he suffered, as there was a societal assumption that Job had sinned and was receiving justice from God. As a result, Job gains empathy for his daughters "for being excluded through no fault of one's own".

With the prologue and epilogue of Job, the ethical evolution of Job can be experienced through his evolving relationship with his daughters. As a natural narrative and ethical conclusion to personal and societal injustices, Jemimah and her sisters were granted inheritances by her father, Job, and described as the most beautiful women in the land (Job 42:15). Apart from these brief references at the end of the Book of Job, Jemimah is not mentioned elsewhere in the Bible.

The name Jemimah means "dove".

In Job 42:14 (ESV):

And he called the name of the first daughter Jemimah, and the name of the second Keziah, and the name of the third Keren-Happuch.
