= ʽAwqad, Salalah =

`Awqad العوقدين
- Village
- Location in Oman
- Coordinates: 16°59′N 54°00′E
- Country: Oman
- Governorate: Dhofar Governorate
- Time zone: UTC+4 (Oman Standard Time)

`Awqad (Arabic: عوقد) or Al-Awqadain (Arabic: العوقدين) is an area within the city of Salalah in Dhofar Governorate, in southwestern Oman.
