= Keziah =

Biblical character; daughter of Job

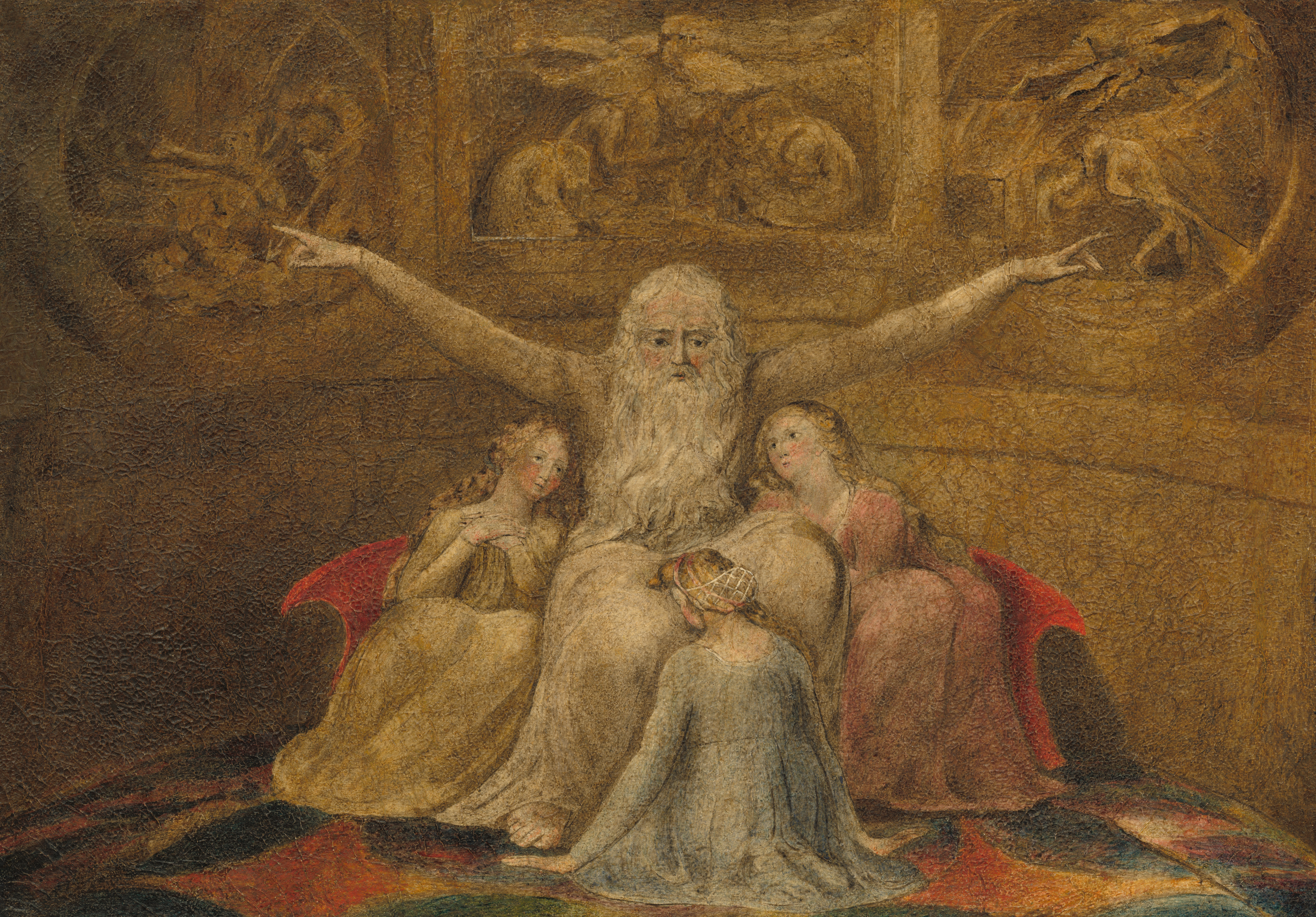
Job with his three daughters William Blake, 1805

Keziah (Hebrew: קְצִיעָה Qəṣī‘ā; Greek: Κασία, Kasia; also Ketziah) is a woman in the Hebrew Bible. She was the second of the three daughters born to Job after his sufferings (Job 42:14–17). Her elder sister was Jemima and her younger sister Keren-Happuch.

The name Keziah means 'cinnamon bark’, referring to the Hebrew word ‘to scrape off’.. Job gave the name to one of his daughters born after his restoration following the trials he faced in the first part of his life. The name has been taken to symbolize female equality, since all of Job's three daughters received an inheritance from their father, an unusual circumstance in a time period when women and men were not treated equally.

== In Popular Culture ==
Keziah Mason is the name of a witch in H. P. Lovecraft's short story The Dreams in the Witch House. She is an advanced mathematician, who has unlocked the method of interdimensional space travel, and is an agent of Nyarlathotep.
