= Tomb of Job =

Shrine located in southwestern Oman

Tomb of the Prophet Ayyub
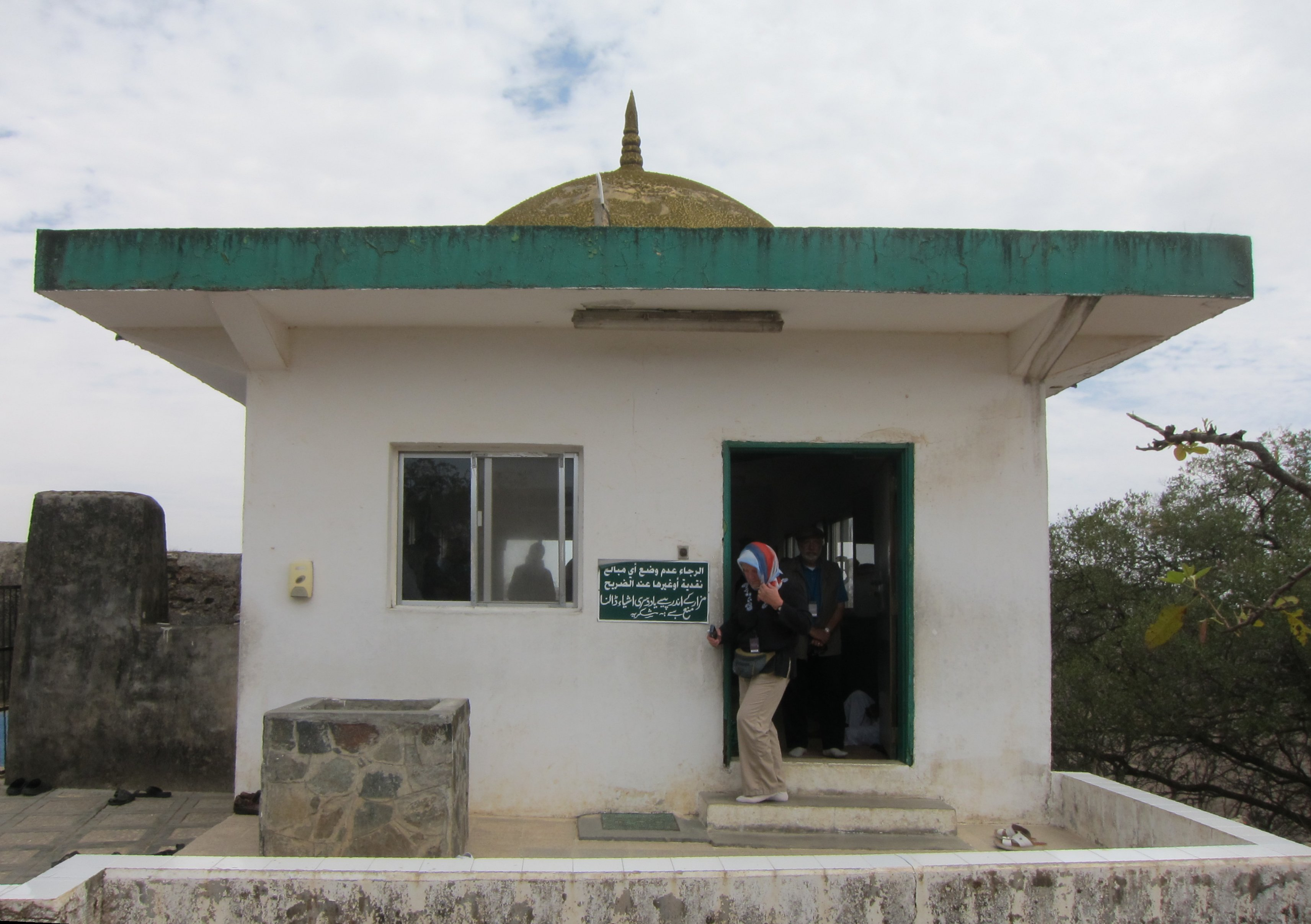
- Main entrance to the shrine.

- Location within Oman

General information
- Status: Active
- Type: Shrine, mausoleum
- Architectural style: Islamic architecture
- Location: Dhofar Governorate, Oman
- Coordinates: 17.1117668°N 53.9939249°E

The Tomb of the Prophet Ayyub (Arabic: ضريح النبي أيوب) is a shrine located in the village of Hayawt in Dhofar Governorate, southwestern Oman. It is believed by locals to be the burial place of the biblical prophet Job, who is revered by Muslims under the name Ayyub. Islamic traditions however maintain that the graves of all prophets are unknown with the exception of those of Muhammad and Abraham.

A mosque used to stand next to the shrine, although it was eventually demolished for unknown reasons. The present day shrine is still regularly visited by both locals and people from far abroad.

== Architecture ==
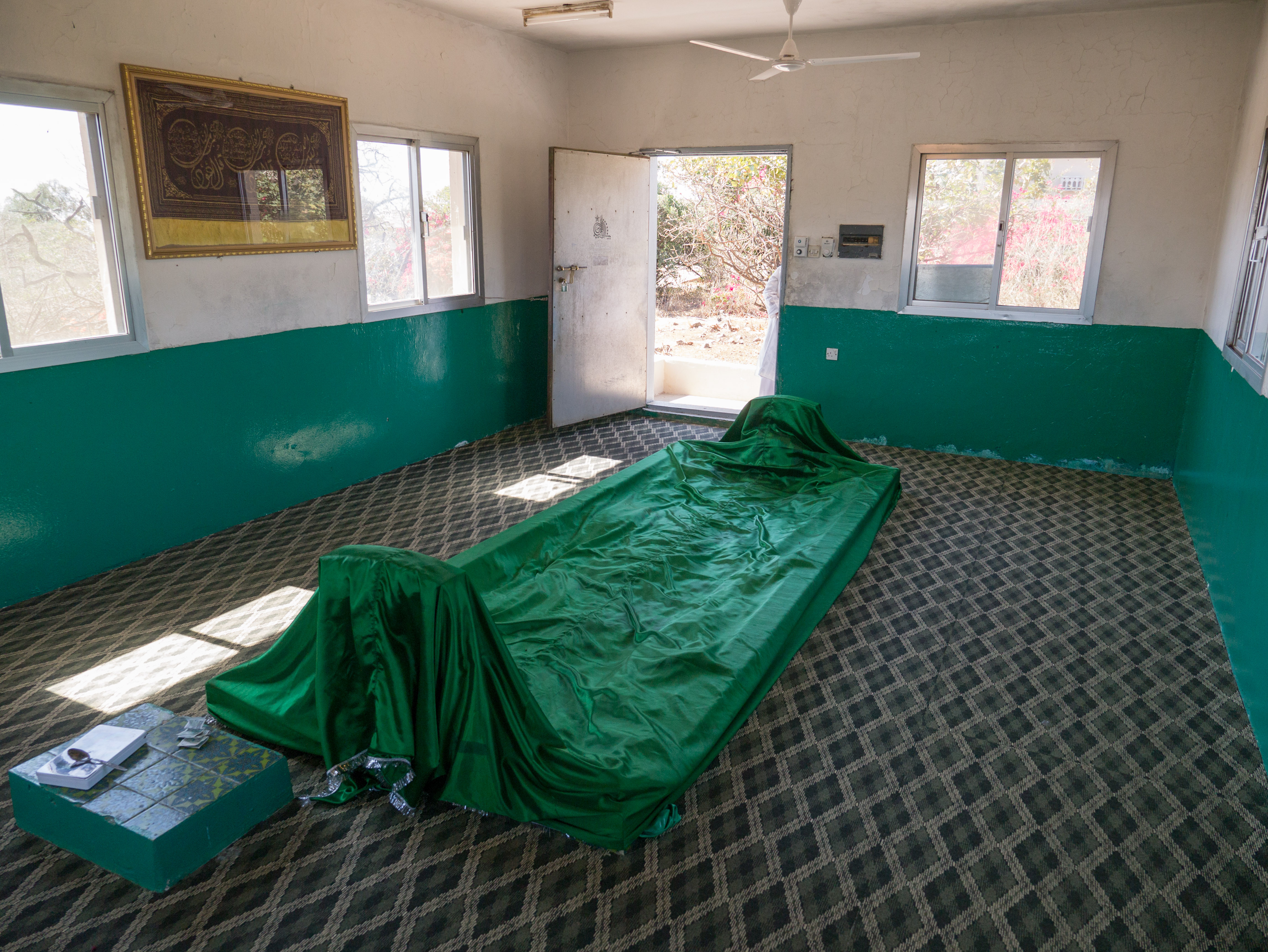
The inside of the shrine. The grave of Job is in the centre, covered by green silk.

The shrine is a cuboid structure made out of brick and topped by a flat dome. There are two qibla walls for prayer, one facing Mecca and the other facing Jerusalem, which was the former direction of prayer before the arrival of the Islamic prophet Muhammad. The purported grave of Ayyub is four metres long and situated in the centre of the floor, usually covered with a green silk cloth. A doorway at the side of the shrine leads into a small courtyard which serves as a musalla for visitors and devotees to perform their prayers.

== Other locations believed to be the burial place of Ayyub ==
During the Mughal Empire, a shrine containing a tomb dedicated to Ayyub was located in Ayodhya, although said shrine does not survive anymore. In the present day, there are tombs attributed to Ayyub in Turkey and Iraq, although some of them are merely symbolic cenotaphs.

== See also ==
- Burial places of biblical figures
- Tomb of Daniel
