= Owtar =

- Town
- Location in Oman
- Coordinates: 17°10′N 54°05′E
- Country: Oman
- Governorate: Dhofar Governorate
- Time zone: UTC+4 (+4)

Owtar is a town located in Oman.
