= List of rulers of Edom =

The following is a list drawn from biblical texts of the rulers of the ancient Kingdom of Edom in the Levant.

== Descendants of Esau ==
There are two different lists of Esau's wives (עֵשָׂו (Edom אֱדֹֽום) in the Book of Genesis.

- Reuel רְעוּאֵֽל was born of Basemath בָּשְׂמַ֥ת (daughter of Elon the Hittite, wife of Ishmael?), also called Mahalath (the sister of Nebaioth, the firstborn of Ishmael), married just after Jacob's flight to Haran.
  - Nahath נַ֥חַת
  - Zerah זֶ֖רַח (father of Jobab, 2nd Duke of Edom?)
  - Shammah שַׁמָּ֣ה
  - Mizzah מִזָּ֑ה
- Jeush יְע֥וּשׁ, born of Oholibamah אָהֳלִֽיבָמָה֙ (daughter of Anah עֲנָ֔ה (the wife of Beeri?) the daughter of Zibeon צִבְעֹ֖ון the Hivite), also called Judith, daughter of Beeri the Hittite. Married just before Jacob's flight to Haran.
- Jalam יַעְלָ֖ם
- Korah קֹ֑רַח
- Eliphaz אֱלִיפָ֑ז born of Adah עָדָ֗ה daughter of Elon אֵילֹון֙ the Hittite, possibly the same Eliphaz the Temanite as in the Book of Job. Married before Jacob's flight to Haran.
  - Teman תֵּימָ֣ן
  - Omar אֹומָ֔ר
  - Zepho צְפֹ֥ו
  - Gatam גַעְתָּ֖ם
  - Kenaz קְנַֽז
  - Amalek עֲמָלֵ֑ק (born of his concubine Timna תִמְנַ֣ע, the sister of Lotan, the son of Seir)

== Kings and governors ==
=== Non-hereditary kings ===
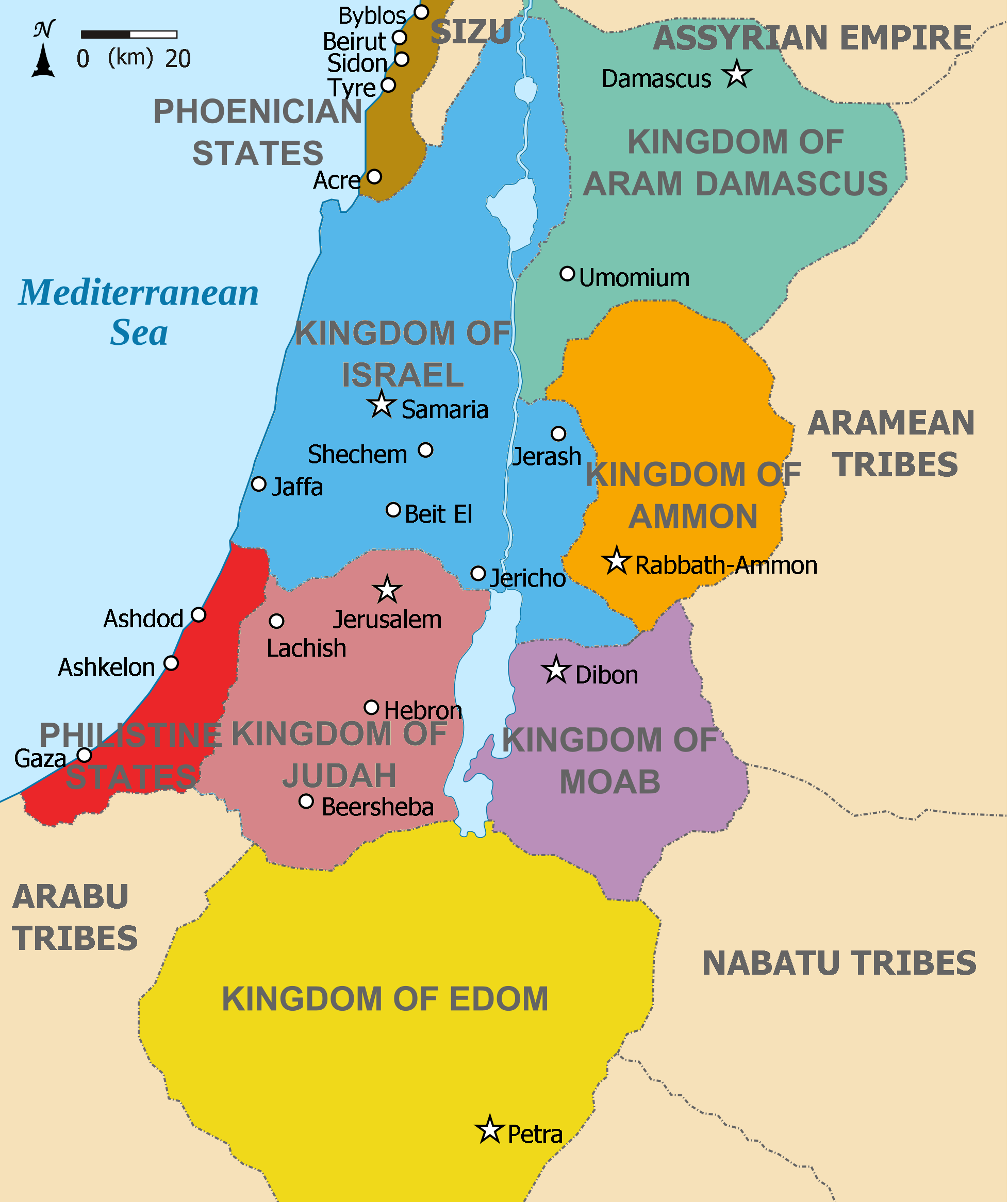
Map of Edom.

"The kings who reigned in the land of Edom, before any king reigned over the Israelites", i.e. before the time of King Saul, are set out in Genesis 36:31-39. R. N. Whybray considers it "plausible" that Edom acquired a monarchy before Israel. Numbers 20:14 sees Moses sending messengers to the King of Edom, referring to Israel as Edom's brother, and when the people of Israel asked Samuel to appoint a king for them, they referred to the practice of "all the other nations". August Dillmann, however, translates this verse as "before an Israelite king reigned", i.e. over Edom, "referring to the subjugation of the Edomites by David", which was later.

King	Son of	From	City
Bela	Beor		Dinhabah
Jobab	Zerah	Bozrah	
Husham		Land of Teman	
Hadad	Bedad		Avith
Samlah		Masreqah	
Shaul		Rehoboth on the river	
Baal-hanan	Achbor		
Hadad			Pau (P'ai)

=== Dukes or chiefs ===
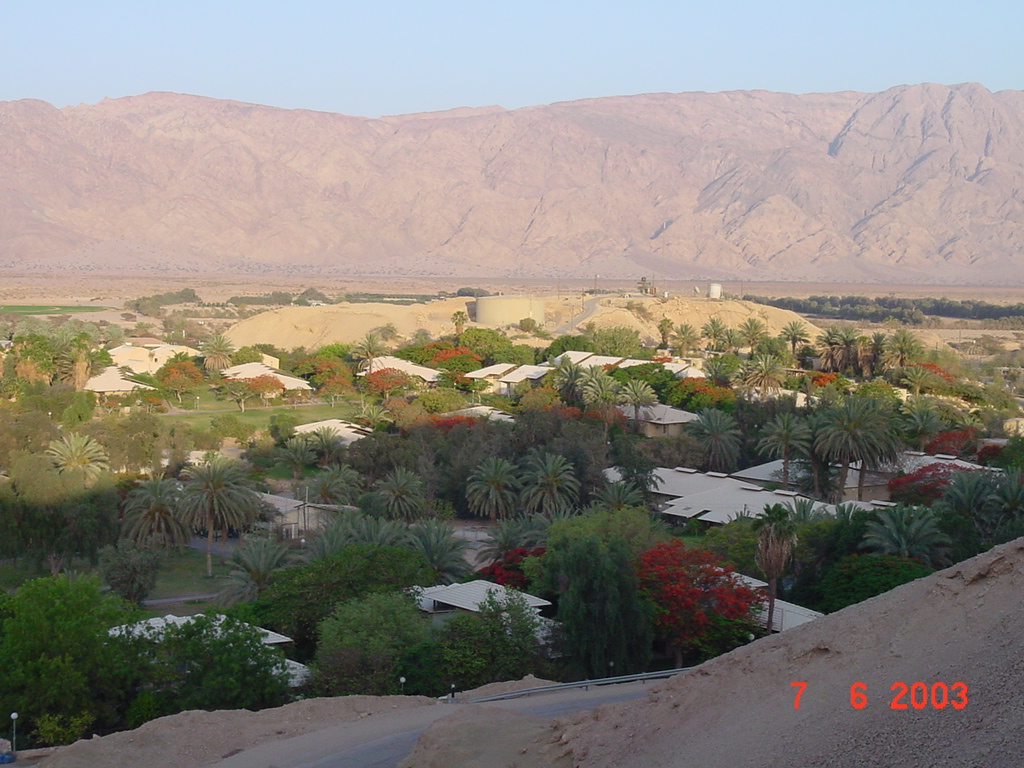
Mountains of Edom

The "chiefs of Esau" are named in Genesis 36:40-43. Historically they have been referred to as the "the dukes of Esau": for example in the King James Version they are "the dukes that came of Esau".

- Timnah (Timna)
- Aliah (Alvah)
- Jetheth
- Oholibamah
- Elah
- Pinon
- Kenaz
- Teman II
- Mibzar
- Magdiel
- Iram

There is a later reference to "the chiefs of Edom" in Exodus 15:15.

George Bush (1796-1859) suggests that this list of dukes who are "of" (i.e. descended from) Esau can be read as a continuation of the list of Esau's more immediate descendants in Genesis 36:9-19:

if we regard v. 31—39 as an interpolation, then the portion from verse 40 to the end of the chapter is to be taken in immediate connexion with verse 29, and understood as a continuation of that account, the former part giving us a list of the Horite dukes, and the latter of those of the line of Esau.

== Later timeline of Edom and Idumea ==
- To Israel c. 990-922
  - ?
- To Judah 922 - early 9th century
  - ?
- To Assyria 724-612
  - Kaus-malaka fl c. 734 (Assyrian name; Edomite name Qos-melek)
  - Aya-ramu fl. c. 701
  - Kaus-gabri fl. c. 680 (Assyrian name; Edomite name Qos-geber)
- To Babylon 612-539
  - ?
- Independence 539-c. 275
  - ?
- To the Seleucid Empire c. 200-160
  - ? c. 270 - c. 200
  - Gorgias 160s
  - ? 160-109

=== Governors of Idumea under the Hasmonean dynasty from 109 BC ===
  - Antipas c. 100-78
  - Antipater 78-43

=== Governors of Idumea under Herod ===
Note that the Herodian dynasty itself was of Idumaean extraction.

- Joseph ben Antipater (brother of Herod the Great). c. 43-35
- Costobarus (brother-in-law of Herod the Great).......30s
- To Judea directly.................................30s-4
- To Rome..........................................4 BC- AD 60

=== Governors of Idumea under the revolutionary government of Judaea ===
- Niger the Perean
- Joshua ben Saphas ha-Kohen
- Eleazar ben Hananiah
- To Rome
