= Baal-hanan =

Baal-hanan (Hebrew: בַּעַל חָנָן / בָּעַל חָנָן, Standard Baʿal Ḥanan Tiberian Baʿal Ḥānān / Bāʿal Ḥānān) means "Baal has been gracious". There are two men by this name in the Hebrew Bible.

In Genesis 36:38–39, Baal-hanan is a King of Edom. He is also mentioned in the King List in 1 Chronicles 1:49–50. He succeeded Shaul and was himself succeeded by Hadar. He was the son of Achbor.

He is called the son of Achbor; but the name of his native city is not given. For this and other reasons, Marquart supposes that "son of Achbor" is a duplicate of "son of Beor" (Gen. 36:32), and that "Baal-hanan" in the original text is given as the name of the father of the next king, Hadar.

The date and even historicity of his reign are unknown, as he is not mentioned in any other surviving source.

In the Books of Chronicles there is also a second man by this name, from the city of Geder. In 1 Chronicles 27:28 he is described as being responsible to King David for the care of olive and sycamore trees.

Preceded by Saul of Rehoboth	King of Edom	Succeeded by Hadar
