= Quzah =

Arabic god of the weather

Quzaḥ (Arabic: قزح) is a pre-Islamic Arab god of weather, worshiped by the people of Muzdalifah. The pre-Islamic rite of the Ifada celebrated after the September equinox was performed facing the direction of Quzah's sanctuary. A lasting reference to Quzah is the term qaws Quzaḥ (Arabic: قوس قزح; 'bow of Quzah'), which became the Arabic term for rainbow. Qaws is also said to be the name of the chief deity worshipped by the Edomites, though Josephus actually identified him as Quzah.
