= National god =

Guardian deity of an ethnic group or political unit

A national god or tribal god is a guardian deity whose special concern is supposed to be the safety and well-being of an 'ethnic group' (nation).

== In historic times ==
This perception of divinity was common in the ancient world. Deities were often geographically localized by association to their main cult centers, and in the Ancient Near East were often tutelary deities of their respective city-states. Many of the individual ethnic groups also considered itself the progeny of its national gods.

=== West Asia ===
In Mesopotamian civilizations like Babylon and Assyria, the deities Marduk and Assur served as principle guardian protectors and national gods of the Babylonians and Assyrians respectively. For Persia, Ahura Mazda served that role as the principle and unifying empire god.

Ephraim Stern identified the national gods of Caananite groups. For the Phoenicians it was Ba'al, for the Philistines the chief god was Dagon, but later Ba'al as well. Ammonites had Milkom as their patron, Moabites had Chemosh, Edomites were associated with Qos, and Judahites with Yahweh. The Sidonians, also had the goddess Astarte, and Tyrians had Melqart.

Some scholars argue Yahweh's role as god of the Kingdom of Judah and the Kingdom of Israel is a key reason for that figure's adoption as a monotheist deity by the Yahweh-only movement of the 7th-century BC. Yahweh's subsequent exaltation as a supreme figure occurred not because national gods were necessarily heads of their pantheons (this was certainly not the case for the national gods of the peoples surrounding Israel), but as a reaction to the changing political landscape, in which other national gods had previously become exalted in that fashion. Because peoples were perceived to effectively worship the same gods, merely by different names—which Mark S. Smith terms this "translatability", Yahweh's function as a national god had previously automatically equated him with other national deities. Thus, with the rise of the multi-cultural Assyrian Empire in the 10th century BC, the concomitant rise of the Assyrian's nation god Assur to inter-cultural prominence influenced how national gods were generally perceived. Moreover, the political unification of the fractured nation-states under a single supreme head of state encouraged the idea of a multi-national "one-god" worldview as well. By the 7th-century BC however, Assyria was in decline and the smaller nation-states began to reassert their independence. In this context, the development of a "one-god" worldview in 7th century BC Kingdom of Judah can be perceived as a response to the diminishing claims to cultural hegemony of the Assyrian "one-god" ideology of the time. These scholars believe this process is evident in some parts of the Torah which predate the 6th century BC and thus preserve vestiges of the theology centered on a national god during the 10th-century BC monarchic period. They consider the Old Testament to still be conscious of the fact that YHWH, the national god of Israel, originally was one of the gods in the council of El (Deut 32:8-9).

In the region of South Arabia in what is now Yemen, the Sabaeans, the Minaeans and the Himyar each perceived themselves to be the children of respectively Almaqah, Wadd and Shamash. Balu is considered the god of Kingdom of Awsan, while others have said Wadd was too as an overseer.

=== Central Asia ===
Jean-Paul Roux named Tengri as the national god of the Gokturk Khanate, or of all Turkic peoples.

=== South Asia ===
During the early Vedic period and amongst the Indo-Aryan peoples, Indra was the national god of the Indo-Aryan people and the Bharatas, revered as a benefactor and champion who protected the Arya tribes against Non-Vedic enemy factions. In Sri Lanka the god Kataragama is equated with Skanda, and developed into a national god.

=== Europe ===
In the ancient Greek narrative of the Illiad, Apollo serves as national representative and divine protector for the people of Troy. The transition of Greek society to city states had some with national deities, such as the Athenians whose patron was Athena. Martti Haavio for the Finnish people, characterized Ukko as that nation's god.

=== Americas ===
In the Mesoamerican civilization of the Mayans, Itzamna served as the national deity. With the Aztecs, Huitzilopochtli a god of war and sacrifice served that purpose for the Mexica. In another reworking of the myth, Huitzilopochtli was substituted for Maquizoatl, and they raised this national god to the same level of importance as Tezcatlipoca and Quetzalcoatl. The Tlaxcallans who opposed the Aztecs, had Camaxtli who is equivalent to Huitzilopochtli.

=== Africa ===
For the ancient Egyptians, Amun, Amun-Ra, and Horus during the New Kingdom became the nationally worshipped gods.

== Modern period ==
=== Philippine ===
In search of a national culture and identity away from the Catholic religion imposed by Spain during its colonisation of the Philippines, those who instigated the Philippine Revolution proposed to revive indigenous Philippine folk religions and make them the national religion of the entire country. The Katipunan opposed the religious teachings of the Spanish friars, saying that they "obscured rather than explained religious truths." After the revival of the Katipunan during the Spanish–American War, an idealized form of the folk religions was proposed by some, with the worship of God under the ancient name Bathala, which applies to all supreme deities under the many ethnic pantheons across the country. However, the re-vitalization process of the indigenous faiths of the Philippines did not progress further as the Filipino forces were defeated by the Americans in 1902, which led to the second Christian colonization of the archipelago.

=== Germanic ===
Carl Jung in his essay Wotan (1936) identifies the Germanic god of the storm (leader of the Wild Hunt), Wotan, as the national god of the German people, and warns of the rise of German nationalism and ultimately the then-impending catastrophe of Nazism and World War II in terms of the re-awakening of this god:

"But what is more than curious — indeed, piquant to a degree — is that an ancient god of storm and frenzy, the long quiescent Wotan, should awake, like an extinct volcano, to new activity, in a civilized country that had long been supposed to have outgrown the Middle Ages. [...] I venture the heretical suggestion that the unfathomable depths of Wotan's character explain more of National Socialism than all three reasonable factors [viz. economic, political, and psychological] put together. [...] This is a tragic experience and no disgrace. It has always been terrible to fall into the hands of a living god. Yahweh was no exception to this rule, and the Philistines, Edomites, Amorites and the rest, who were outside the Yahweh experience, must certainly have found it exceedingly disagreeable. The Semitic experience of Allah was for a long time an extremely painful affair for the whole of Christendom. We who stand outside judge the Germans far too much, as if they were responsible agents, but perhaps it would be nearer the truth to regard them, also, as victims."

=== Japanese ===
In Japan, the Yasukuni Shrine was seen as the highest honour a subject could receive, where they are honoured for their death in service to the nation, followed by an apotheosis as a national god.

=== Christianity ===
Christian missionaries have repeatedly re-interpreted national gods in terms of the Christian God. This fact is reflected in the names of God in various languages of Christianized peoples, such as Shangdi or Shen among Chinese Christians, Ngai among a number of tribes of Kenya, etc.

In a modern context, the term of a "national god" addresses the emergence of national churches within Christianity. This tendency of "nationalizing" the Christian God, especially in the context of national churches sanctioning warfare against other Christian nations during World War I, was denounced as heretical by Karl Barth.

=== Indic Religions ===
Indra is still one of the primary ancient Vedic deities in Hinduism. He is the king of Svarga (Heaven) and the Devas (gods). He is associated with lightning, thunder, storms, rains, river flows and war. Indra is the most frequently mentioned deity in the Rigveda. Indra's mythology and powers are similar to other Indo-European deities such as Jupiter, Perun, Perkūnas, Zalmoxis, Taranis, Zeus, and Thor, suggesting a common origin in Proto-Indo-European mythology.

Bharat Mata, starting in the late 19th century a divine personification of India (Bharat), came into existence after the Indian Rebellion of 1857 against the British and is seen as the goddess of India and the Indian people by Hindus, Jains, and some Buddhists.

== See also ==
- Constitutional references to God
- Cult image, a human-made object that is venerated for the deity, person, or spirit that it represents.
- Ethnic religion
- God and the State
- Imperial cult, form of state religion.
- National personification, fictional character representing a country.
- Patron deity
- Religious exclusivism
