= Job's wife =

Biblical figure

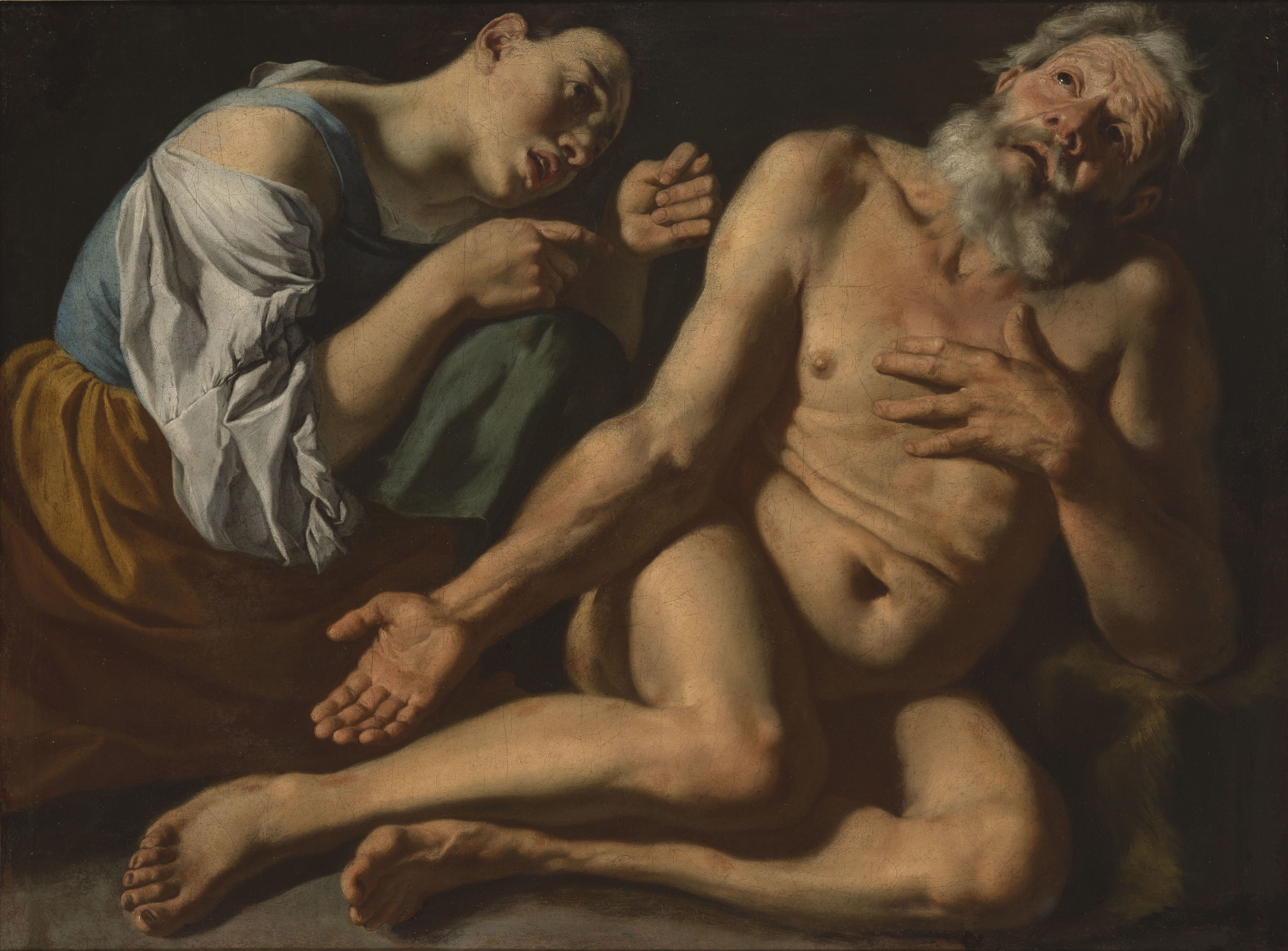
Gaspare Traversi, Job mocked by his wife.

Job's wife is an unnamed biblical figure mentioned in the Book of Job.

== Biblical narrative ==
Job's wife appears only in chapter 2, when Job is afflicted with sores. She says to him in verse 9, "Do you still hold fast your integrity? Curse God and die" (ESV). The word translated "curse" actually means "bless", but almost all English translations view it as a euphemism.

Job then rebukes his wife in verse 10, and says to her, "You speak as one of the foolish women would speak."

Job's wife is never heard of again, except for passing mentions in 19:17 (when Job says, "My breath is strange to my wife") and 31:10 ("then let my wife grind for another"). In chapter 42, Job gets more children (verse 13) but there is no mention of whether it is with the same wife or a different one.

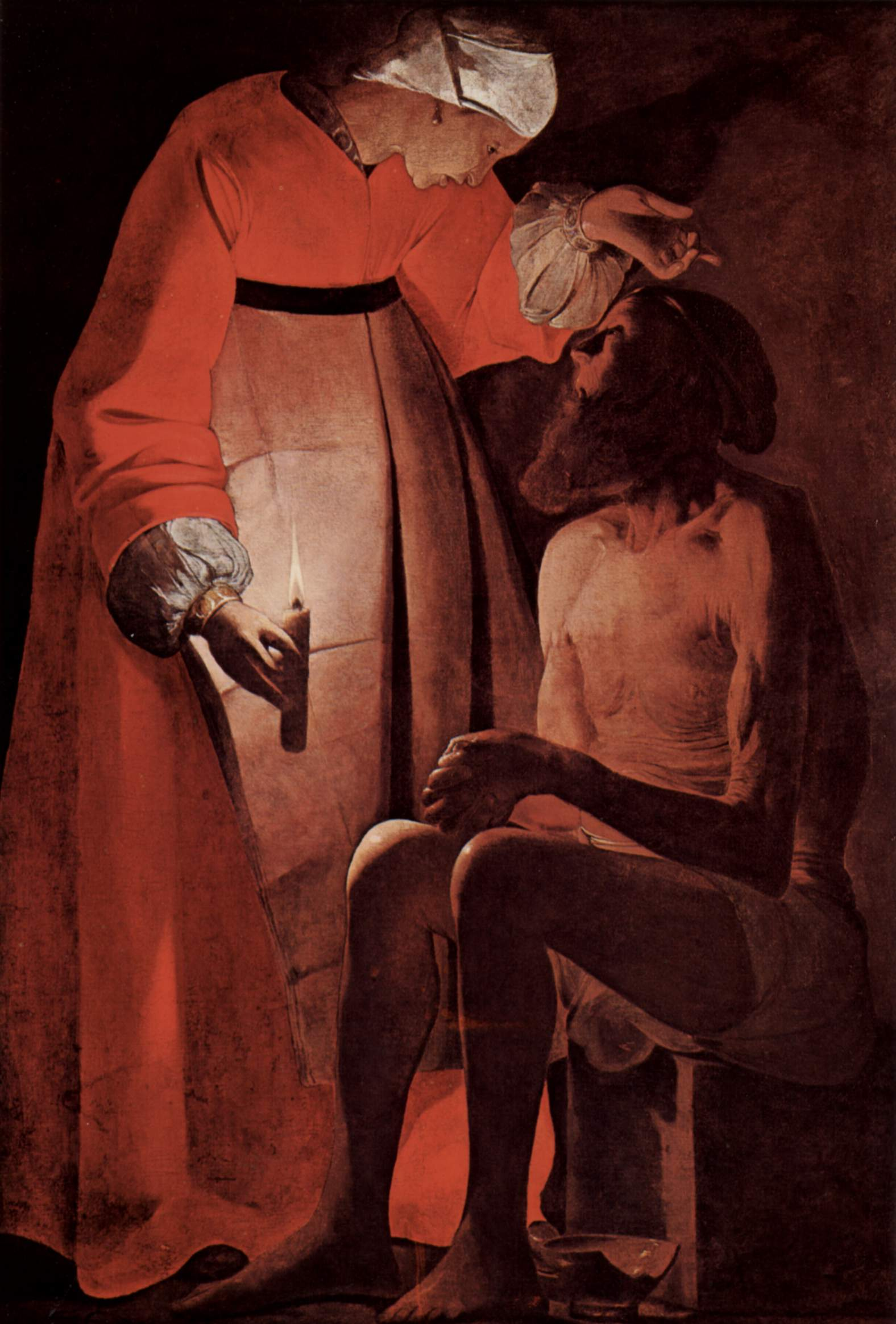
Georges de La Tour, Job Taunted by his Wife.

== Tradition ==
In the apocryphal Testament of Job, Job's wife occupies a more prominent role and is given the name Sitis. The children born at the end of Job's suffering are to a different wife, who is identified as Dinah, daughter of Jacob.

== Evaluation ==
Job's wife is usually viewed negatively. S. G. De Graaf argues that she ridiculed Job "because he continued to trust in the Lord". Abraham Kuyper even suggests that she is Job's last trial: "Satan knew he could use her as an instrument with which to grieve and torture his victim, and for that reason he permitted her to live." Other commentators point to the fact that she, too, lost her children. Ilana Pardes appeals to 19:17 in saying that "she too, after all, is a victim of these divine tests in addition to being pained by exposure to his afflictions".

Some scholars view Job's wife positively. Pardes says, "Much like Eve, Job’s wife spurs her husband to doubt God’s use of divine powers. In doing so she does him much good, for this turns out to be the royal road to deepening one’s knowledge, to opening one’s eyes." She also notes that Job "comes close to doing what his wife had suggested." Carol A. Newsom calls the words of Job's wife "radical and provocative" and notes the ambiguity in the word "integrity": she could be suggesting that Job's righteousness has not done him much good so far, or she could be suggesting that Job continues in his honesty even to the point of cursing God. Newsom concludes that "Job's wife is the prototypical woman on the margin, whose iconoclastic words provoke defensive condemnation but whose insight serves as an irritant that undermines old complacencies."

== See also ==
- List of names for the biblical nameless
