= Qos (deity) =

National god of the Edomites

Qos (Edomite: 𐤒𐤅𐤎 Qāws, later Qôs; Hebrew: קוֹס Qōs) also Qaus (Akkadian: 𒋡𒍑 Qa-uš), or Koze (Greek: Kωζαι Kōzai) was the national god of the Edomites. He was the Idumean structural parallel to Yahweh. The name occurs only twice in the Old Testament (if a possible allusion in an otherwise corrupted text in the Book of Proverbs is excluded) in the Book of Ezra and Nehemiah as an element in a personal name, Barqos ("son of Qos"), referring to the 'father' of a family or clan of perhaps Edomite/Idumaean nəṯīnīm or temple helpers returning from the Babylonian exile. Outside the Bible, Qos is frequently invoked in names found on documents recovered from excavations in Elephantine, where a mixed population of Arabs, Jews and Idumeans lived under the protection of a Persian-Mesopotamian garrison.

== Origins, meaning and cult ==
The word "Qos" is never used on its own in the Tanakh, however it does unambiguously appear twice as an element in a personal name in Ezra 2:53 and Nehemiah 7:55 as Barqos, "son of Qos". Qōs (Arabic: قوس) is an Arabic word meaning bow, probably suggesting the god's name origin. (Note: The Arabic names for three stars in the constellation of Sagittarius that comprise the archer's bow are all named Qos as well, but commonly transcribed as Kaus Media,Kaus Borealis and Kaus Australis, with the Latin names as translations of their original Arabic positioning.) Based on a reference in Josephus, Javier Teixidor believes Qōs must have become identified with Quzah, "the archer" in the north Arabian pantheon, worshiped both as a mountain and a weather god. The similarity of the name would have permitted an assimilation of Qōs to the Arabian god of the rainbow, qaws quzaḥ. On the basis of the same reference, John F. Healey believes that evidence for this identification is limited.

The worship of Qōs appears to originally have been located in the Ḥismā area of southern Jordan and north-western Arabia, where a mountain, Jabal al-Qaus, still bears that name. He entered the Edomite pantheon as early as the 8th century B.C. M. Rose speculates that, prior to Qōs's advent, Edom may have worshipped Yahweh—early Egyptian records reference a place called yhw in the land of the Shasu—and the former then overlaid the latter and assumed supremacy there when the Idumeans lost their autonomy under Persian rule, perhaps compensating for the destruction of national independence, a mechanism similar to that of the strengthening of Yahweh worship after the fall of the Jewish kingdom. Qōs is described as a "King", is associated with light, and defined as "mighty". His works are described as ones where he "adorns, avenges, blesses, chooses(?) gives".

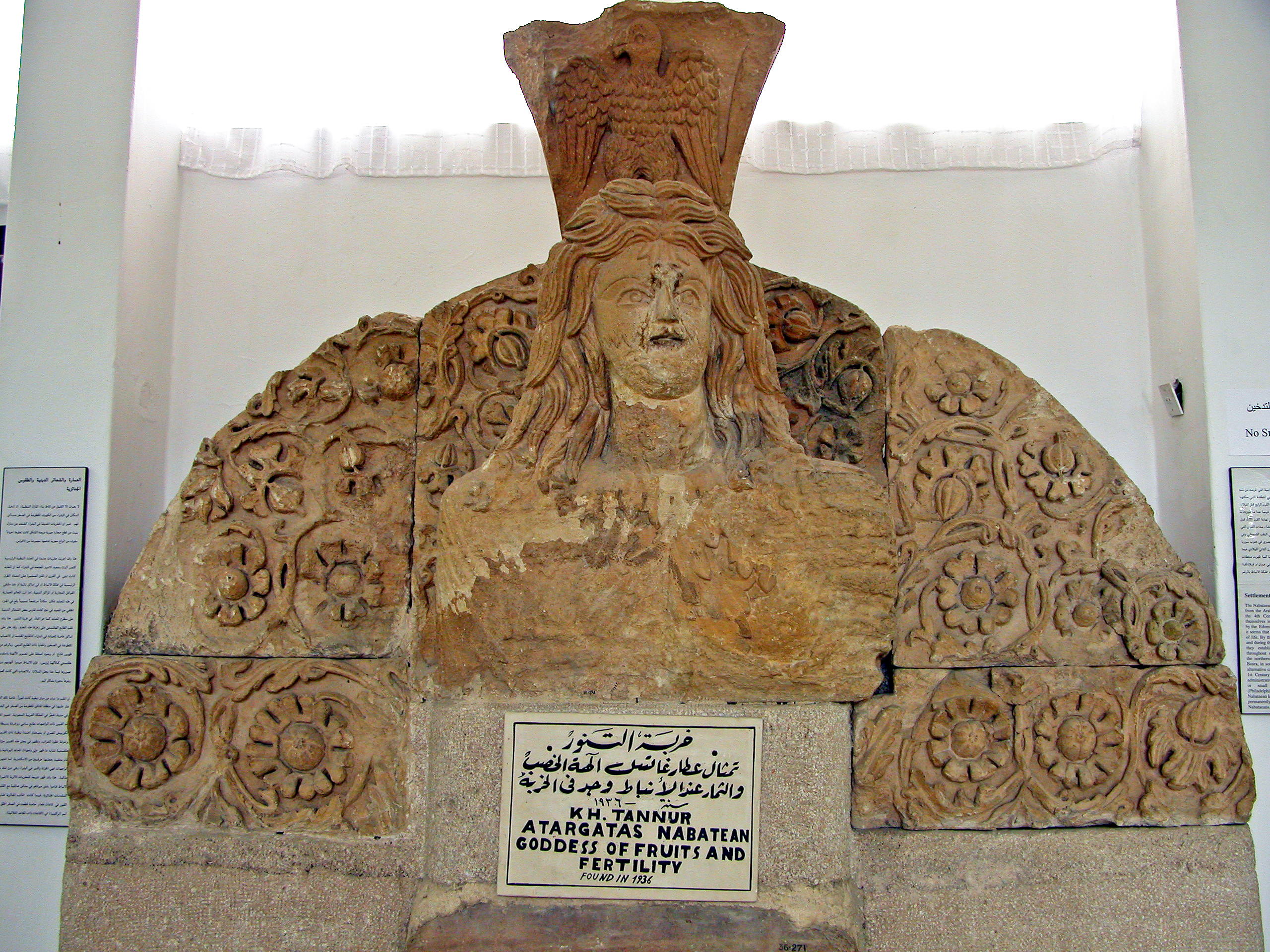
Nabataean depiction of the goddess Atargatis dating from c. AD 100. The eagle on her head is believed to be a symbol of Qos.

Costobarus I, whose name means "Qōs is mighty", was a native Idumean descended from a priestly family attached to this cult. After Herod had placed him in command over (στρατηγὀς) Idumea, Costobarus, supported by Cleopatra, eventually tried to seize the kingdom from Herod's Judea. In order to garner local support for his defection, he revived the old cult of Qōs, perhaps to get Idumea's rural population, still attached to its traditional gods, to back him. The name recurs in the Nabataean language in an inscription at Khirbet et-Tannur, where he is syncretized with the deity Dushara, who is represented flanked by bulls, seated on a throne while wielding in his left hand a multi-pronged thunderbolt, suggestive of a function as a weather god. He is also on an altar in Idumean Mamre.

The deity's name was used as the theophoric element in many Idumean names, including the names of the Edomite kings Qōs-malaku, a tributary of Tiglath-Pileser III and Qōs-gabar a tributary of Esarhaddon.

== Qos and Yahweh ==
Unlike the chief god of the Ammonites (Milcom) and the Moabites (Chemosh), the Tanakh refrains from explicitly naming the Edomite Qōs. The omission may be explained, according to some scholars, by assuming there were close similarities between Yahweh and Qōs, which would have made rejection of the latter difficult. Other scholars have suggested that the tensions between Judeans and Edomites during the Second Temple period may lie behind the omission of Qōs in the Bible.

A poetic refrain in Judges in the Hebrew Bible states that Yahweh embarked from Se'ir in the region of Edom. Recently, the view has been advanced that Yahweh was originally a Kenite god whose cult spread north of Midian to the Israelites. According to this approach, Qōs might possibly have been a title for Yahweh, rather than a name. A further point connecting Yahweh with Qōs, aside from their common origin in that territory, is that the Edomite cult of the latter shared characteristics of the former. Thus, we find that Doeg the Edomite has no problem in worshiping Yahweh, he is shown to be at home in Jewish sanctuaries. Circumcision, an essential Jewish rite, was practiced in Edom. Additionally, supplication of Yahweh is not uncommon where mentions of Qos are lacking: a pottery sherd from the late 9th/early 8th centuries BCE at Kuntillet Ajrud blesses its recipient by "Yahweh of Teman", which some have taken as implying that, at least from an Israelite perspective, Qos and Yahweh were considered identical, though it by no means necessarily proves it. On the other hand, there are some discrepancies which make a direct association between the two difficult. The identification of names in the Egyptian list of Shasu clans in Se'ir creates a continuity problem, since Qos names only emerge some 500 years later. Oded Balaban and Ernst Axel Knauf have claimed that certain names found on Ramesside topographical lists are theophoric and contain references to Qos, which if true would put the deity's earliest attestation more than 600 years before Yahweh's.

== See also ==
- Quzah
