= Job 2 =

2nd chapter of the Book of Job

- ← chapter 1 chapter 3 →
- The whole Book of Job in the Leningrad Codex (1008 C.E.) from an old facsimile edition.
- Book: Book of Job
- Hebrew Bible part: Ketuvim
- Order in the Hebrew part: 3
- Category: Sifrei Emet
- Christian Bible part: Old Testament
- Order in the Christian part: 18

Job 2 is the second chapter of the Book of Job in the Hebrew Bible or the Old Testament of the Christian Bible. The book is anonymous; most scholars believe it was written around 6th century BCE. This chapter belongs to the prologue of the book, comprising Job 1:1–2:13.

== Text ==
The original text is written in Hebrew language. This chapter is divided into 13 verses.

=== Textual witnesses ===
Some early manuscripts containing the text of this chapter in Hebrew are of the Masoretic Text, which includes the Aleppo Codex (10th century), and Codex Leningradensis (1008).

There is also a translation into Koine Greek known as the Septuagint, made in the last few centuries BC; some extant ancient manuscripts of this version include Codex Vaticanus (B; $\mathfrak{G}$^{B}; 4th century), Codex Sinaiticus (S; BHK: $\mathfrak{G}$^{S}; 4th century), and Codex Alexandrinus (A; $\mathfrak{G}$^{A}; 5th century).

== Analysis ==
Within the structure of the book, chapters 1 and 2 are grouped as "the Prologue" with the following outline:

- Job Is Utterly Righteous (1:1–5)
- The First Heavenly Court Scene (1:6–12)
- The First Test - Loss of Possessions and Family (1:13–19)
- Job's First Reaction to His Loss and the Narrator's Verdict (1:20–22)
- The Second Heavenly Court Scene (2:1–6)
- The Second Test - Ghastly Sores (2:7–10)
- The Arrival and Mission of the Friends (2:11–13)

The whole section precedes the following parts of the book:

- The Dialogue (chapters 3–31)
- The Verdicts (32:1–42:6)
- The Epilogue (42:7–17)

The Prologue consists of five scenes in prose form (1:1–5; 1:6–12; 1:13–22; 2:1–6; 2:7–13 (3:1)) — alternating between earth and heaven — which introduce the main characters and the theological issue to be explored.

== Second conversation (2:1–6) ==
The passage describes the conversation in the second heavenly court which is very similar to the first one. From verse 1 to the middle of verse 3, the narrative practically repeats Job 1:7–8, except for the addition of three Hebrew words at the end of verse 2:1 (להתיצב על יהוה, lə-hiṯ-yaṣ-ṣêḇ ‘al- YHWH, translated: "to present himself before YHWH") and the difference in the Hebrew word used for "from where" (מֵאַ֣יִן, mê-’a-yin, in 1:7; אי מזה, ’ê miz-zeh, in 2:2). It is indicated that after the series of calamities on his possession and children, Job continues to "cling to" his integrity, basically maintaining all his commendable personal qualities. YHWH states that he has been "incited" to "ruin" Job "without any reason", acknowledging that YHWH is accountable and responsible, but mainly also inviting the Adversary to concede that Job passed the test. The Adversary responds that the test did not go far enough, using the phrase "skin for skin" (verse 4) to make the exchange equal by including all that a man would give up to save his own skin. YHWH permits the Adversary to proceed with the second test, to touch ("harm" or "strike") Job's "flesh and bone" but not Job's "life". Thereafter God will not speak again until chapter 38.

=== Verse 3 ===
The Lord said to the Adversary, "Have you considered My servant Job, that there is none like him on the earth, a blameless and an upright man, who fears God and avoids evil? He still holds fast his integrity, although you moved Me against him, to destroy him without cause."

- "Moved": or "incited"; translated from Hebrew word from the root verb sut which has a sense of 'prompting someone to act in a way that is different from what that person would have chosen to do without provocation' (cf. God incited people to do what is wrong in 1 Samuel 26:19; 2 Samuel 24:1; human incited in 2 Kings 18:32; Jeremiah 43:3). 1 Chronicles 21:1 indicates that although YHWH permits evil actions within his sovereign plan, he is not directly causing evil to occur.
- "Without cause": or "without any reason"; translated from Hebrew: khinnam, "for nothing" in Job 1:9; also "in vain" (Ezekiel 6:10), "unnecessarily" (1 Samuel 25:31) or "without compensation" (Genesis 29:15) or referring to undeserved treatments in 1 Samuel 19:5; 1 Kings 2:31.

=== Verse 6 ===
The Lord said to the Adversary, “Very well, he is in your hand, but spare his life.”

- "Very well": or "behold" (KJV, NKJV etc.); translated from the Hebrew particle Hebrew: הִנּוֹ, hinnow, literally, “here he is!” as God presents Job to Satan. The Greek Septuagint renders it “I deliver him up to you.”

This verse shows that YHWH is sovereign over the Adversary by putting limits on how far the action against Job may go.

== Affliction of Job and the Arrival of Counselors (2:7–13) ==
The first part of the section (verses 7–8) describes the second attack by the Adversary on Job, which adds a negative aspect, by afflicting the physical pain of 'ghastly sores', to the removal of the positives in Job's life with the first attack. The words of Job's wife elicits a spoken response from Job about the second attack (verses 9–10). The arrival of Job's three friends, their mourning and silence, left to Job to speak first, setting the stage for the subsequent poetic dialogues (chapter 3 to 42).

=== Verse 7 ===
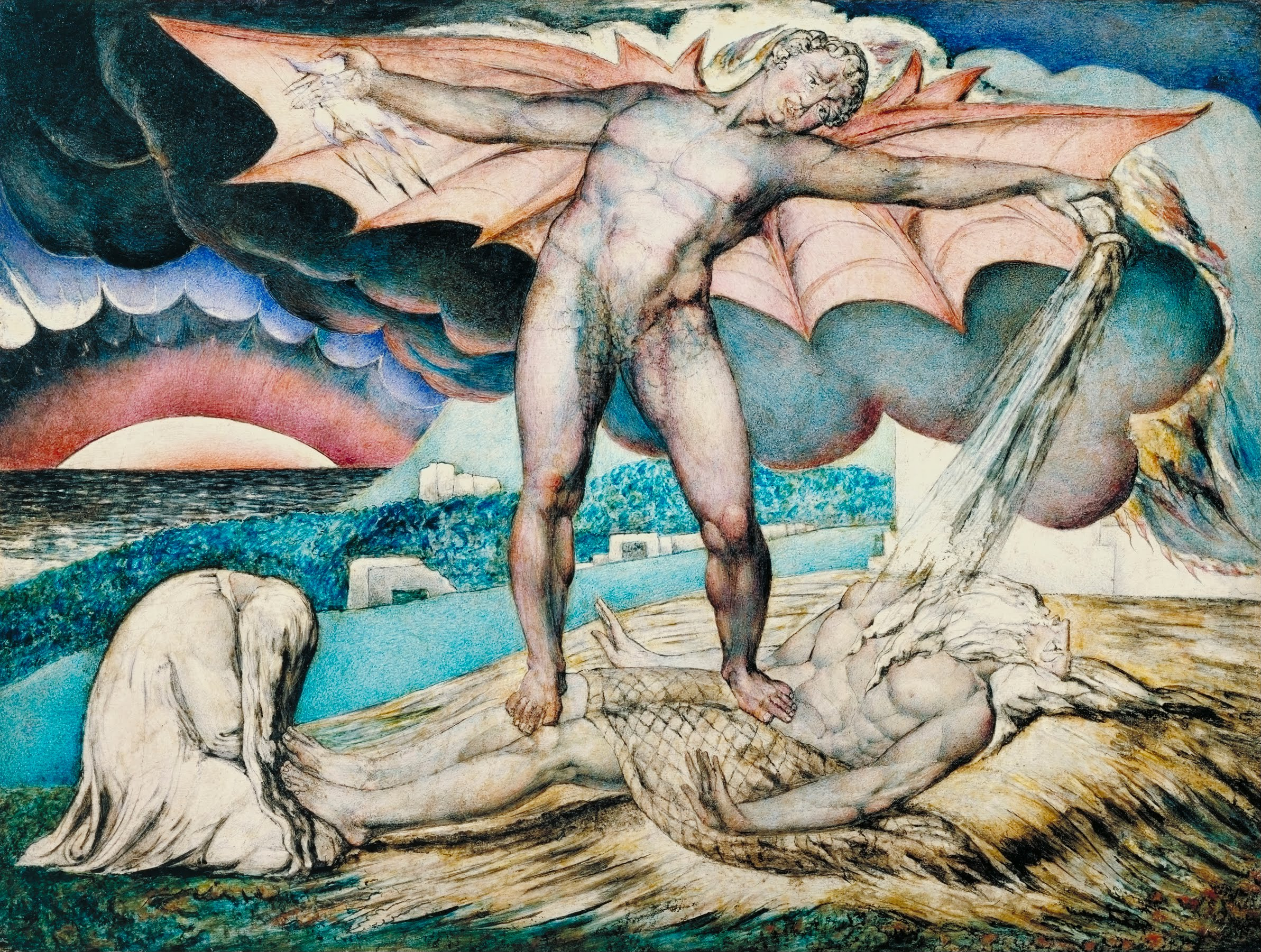
"Satan Smiting Job with Sore Boils", painting by William Blake (c. 1826)

Therefore, the Adversary went out from the presence of the Lord, and he afflicted Job with severe sores from the sole of his foot to the top of his head.

- "Severe sores": from Hebrew: שְׁחִין, shekhin, "boils". It is not the same as the term translated as "leprosy", but more involving 'inflammation of the skin'.

=== Verse 8 ===
Job took a piece of broken pottery to scrape himself, and he sat in ashes in misery.

=== Verse 9 ===
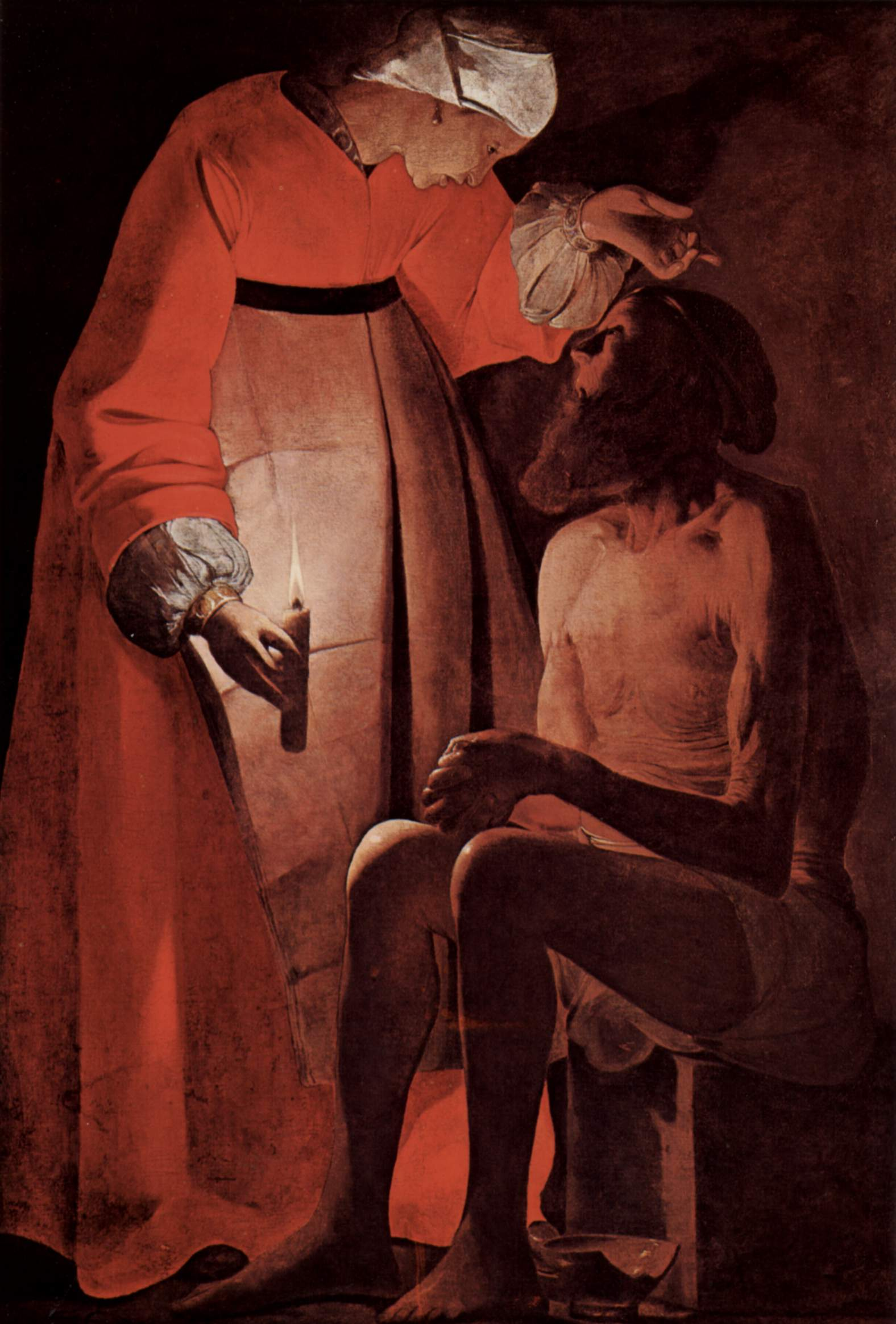
"Job Taunted by his Wife", painting by Georges de La Tour (1625–1650)

Then his wife said to him, "Do you still hold fast your integrity? Curse God and die."

- "His wife": Job's wife is only mentioned here in the Hebrew Bible, without a name, but with her only speech. In the Aramaic Targum, her name is called "Dinah", with an allusion to Genesis 34, whereas in the "Testament of Job" she is called "Sitis". The Hebrew root word for "wife" (Hebrew: אִשָּׁה, ishshah) recalls Adam's description of Eve as "bone of my bones and flesh of my flesh" in Genesis 2:23 (Hebrew: עצם מעצמי ובשר מבשרי, ‘e-ṣem mê-‘ă-ṣā-may ū-ḇā-śār mi-bə-śā-rî) in relation to the Adversary's intention to strike Job's "bone and flesh" (verse 5; Hebrew: אל עצמו ואל בשרו, ’el-‘aṣ-mōw wə-’el-bə-śā-rōw, "to his bone and to his flesh").
- "Curse": from the Hebrew verb Hebrew: בָּרַךְ, barakh, literally "bless", but in an evil sense (cf. Job 1:5).

The words of Job's wife can be interpreted as suggesting a "theological method of committing suicide", that is, urging Job 'to put him out of misery by doing the one forbidden thing ("cursing God") that will ensure his immediate destruction and end his endless agony" according to the traditional 'doctrine of (divine) retribution'.

The Greek Septuagint has a longer reading with the phrase "when a long time had passed" in the beginning of the verse and the speech of Job's wife: "How long will you hold out, saying, 'Behold, I wait yet a little while, expecting the hope of my deliverance?' for behold, your memorial is abolished from the earth, even your sons and daughters, the pangs and pains of my womb which I bore in vain with sorrows, and you yourself sit down to spend the night in the open air among the corruption of worms, and I am a wanderer and a servant from place to place and house to house, waiting for the setting sun, that I may rest from my labors and pains that now beset me, but say some word against the Lord and die."

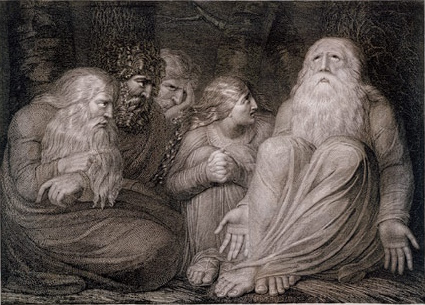
Job's Tormentors from William Blake's Illustrations for the Book of Job.

=== Verse 13 ===
And they sat with him on the ground seven days and seven nights, and no one spoke a word to him, for they saw that his suffering was very great.

- "Suffering": from the Hebrew word כְּאֵב, keʾev, "pain"—both mental and physical pain.

== See also ==
- Bildad the Shuhite
- Boil
- Eliphaz the Temanite
- Job's wife
- Satan
- YHWH
- Zophar the Naamathite
- Related Bible parts: Genesis 2, Job 42

== Sources ==
- Alter, Robert (2010). The Wisdom Books: Job, Proverbs, and Ecclesiastes: A Translation with Commentary. W.W. Norton & Co. ISBN 978-0393080735.
- Coogan, Michael David (2007). Coogan, Michael David; Brettler, Marc Zvi; Newsom, Carol Ann; Perkins, Pheme (eds.). The New Oxford Annotated Bible with the Apocryphal/Deuterocanonical Books: New Revised Standard Version, Issue 48 (Augmented 3rd ed.). Oxford University Press. ISBN 9780195288810.
- Crenshaw, James L. (2007). "17. Job". In Barton, John; Muddiman, John (eds.). The Oxford Bible Commentary (first (paperback) ed.). Oxford University Press. pp. 331–355. ISBN 978-0199277186.
- Estes, Daniel J. (2013). Walton, John H.; Strauss, Mark L. (eds.). Job. Teach the Text Commentary Series. United States: Baker Publishing Group. ISBN 9781441242778.
- Farmer, Kathleen A. (1998). "The Wisdom Books". In McKenzie, Steven L.; Graham, Matt Patrick (eds.). The Hebrew Bible Today: An Introduction to Critical Issues. Westminster John Knox Press. ISBN 978-0-66425652-4.
- Halley, Henry H. (1965). Halley's Bible Handbook: an abbreviated Bible commentary (24th (revised) ed.). Zondervan Publishing House. ISBN 0-310-25720-4.
- Kugler, Robert; Hartin, Patrick J. (2009). An Introduction to the Bible. Eerdmans. ISBN 978-0-8028-4636-5.
- Walton, John H. (2012). Job. United States: Zondervan. ISBN 9780310492009.
- Wilson, Lindsay (2015). Job. United States: Wm. B. Eerdmans Publishing Company. ISBN 9781467443289.
- Würthwein, Ernst (1995). The Text of the Old Testament. Translated by Rhodes, Erroll F. Grand Rapids, MI: Wm. B. Eerdmans. ISBN 0-8028-0788-7.
