= Husham (Edomite king) =

Husham was a king of Edom mentioned in the Bible, in Genesis 36:31-43. He succeeded Jobab ben Zerah in the apparently elective kingship of the Edomites. He is mentioned as being from "the land of Temani", which may refer to the Edomite clan Teman. Husham was succeeded upon his death by Hadad ben Bedad.

The date and even historicity of his reign are unknown, as he is not mentioned in any other surviving source.

Preceded by Jobab ben Zerah	King of Edom	Succeeded by Hadad ben Bedad
