= The Only Problem =

1984 novel by Muriel Spark

- First edition
- Author: Muriel Spark
- Language: English
- Publisher: The Bodley Head (UK); G. P. Putnam's Sons (US)
- Publication date: 1984
- Pages: 189
- ISBN: 978-0-37030-605-6

The Only Problem is a 1984 novel by Scottish author Muriel Spark, published by The Bodley Head in the UK and by Putnam in the US.

== Plot ==
Set near St Die in Vosges in France, the main protagonist - rich Harvey Gotham, lives in a small cottage on the grounds of an empty Chateau where he is writing a book about Job. Periodically Harvey travels to Epinal Museum to view Job Taunted by his Wife by Georges de La Tour, Job's wife looking like Effie. Harvey left his with Effie a year ago and disappeared. His brother-in-law, actor Edward Jansen has discovered him and visits him, hoping that Harvey will divorce Effie, to give her a generous alimony. Effie has had an illegitimate baby Clara which is now being looked after by her sister Ruth (Edward's wife). Ruth and Clara then also arrive and have persuaded Harvey to buy the chateau. The police then believe that Effie has now joined a terrorist organisation called the FLE (Fronte de la Liberation de l'Europe) as they suspect Harvey's involvement...

== Reception ==
- Kirkus Reviews remains unconvinced and concludes that the novel has "inconsistent characters and oddly static treatment of the Job theme: a slight, opaque morality play, only very occasionally brightened by Sparkian wit or style."
- Anita Brookner in The New York Times praises the novel: "Mrs. Spark's characters, although frequently mad, are never dishonest. Indeed, they deliver many stunning truths with an impassive eye or a careless smile; fine literary manners are observed in the precision of their speech. Mrs. Spark, whose point of view is frequently inscrutable, shares with these characters a certain freedom from convention that sanctions their excursions into anarchy...a disturbing and exhilarating experience."
- Jade Kettles writing in the Dundee University Review of the Arts says "Spark's concision and wit throughout her writing are shown prominently through the character of Harvey, whose dry sense of humour while being interrogated by the police and media makes for an amusing read. After Effie's death during a police raid, Harvey can finally finish his work on Job, as the existential crisis in his life has come to an end.'
