= Saul (Edomite king) =

Saul was a king of Edom mentioned in the Bible, in Genesis 36:31-43. He succeeded Samlah of Masrekah in the apparently elective kingship of the early Edomites. He is described as being from "Rehoboth on the River". He was succeeded by Baal-hanan ben Achbor.

The dates and other details of his reign are unknown, as he is not mentioned in any other surviving source.

Preceded by Samlah of Masrekah	King of Edom	Succeeded by Baal-hanan ben Achbor
