= Kaus-gabri =

Ḳaus-gabri (Akkadian: 𒋡𒍑𒃮𒊑 Qauš-gabari; Edomite: 𐤒𐤅𐤎𐤂𐤁𐤓 Qāws-gābr) was king of Udumi or Edom in ca. 680 BC, during the reigns of the Assyrian kings Esarhaddon and Ashurbanipal. His name may mean "[the god] Kaus is my champion". Apart from Assyrian sources, Ḳaus-gabri is also known to appear in a 7th-century BC clay seal impression discovered at the site of Umm al Biyara, which bears the inscription "(Belonging to) Qaus-gabar, King of Edom".
