= Testament of Job =

Apocryphal book

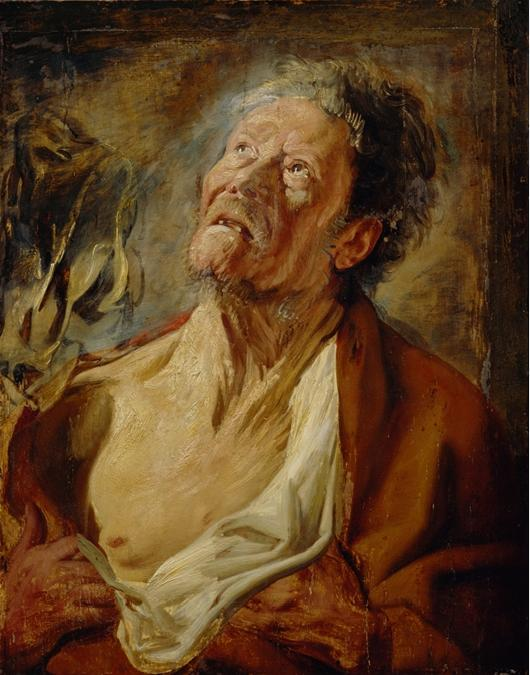
Jacob Jordaens - Abraham Grapheus as Job

The Testament of Job (also referred to as Divrei Lyov, literally meaning "Words of Job") is a book written in the 1st century BC or the 1st century AD. Some Midrashic parallels in the work indicate that it was a production of the pre-Christian era, and belongs to the Jewish apocrypha. Christian scholars refer to such writings as belonging to "intertestamental literature".

The text is not directly dependent on the canonical Book of Job, and presents many differences from it.

== Manuscripts ==
The earliest surviving manuscript is in Coptic, of the 5th century; other early surviving manuscripts are in Greek and Old Slavonic.

In 1967, Sebastian Brock published an edition of the Testament using the Greek ms P as his base. Then a bilingual Greek and English edition, edited by Robert A. Kraft, was issued in New York by the Society of Biblical Literature in 1974 with ISBN 0-88414-044-X. It used the Greek mss S-V as the base.

Maria Haralambakis (2012) surveyed as many as nine Slavonic manuscripts, some of which are now lost. The date of these manuscripts is between the 14th and 18th centuries. Also she covers the ongoing publication of the Coptic text, which is unfortunately rather fragmentary.

The Slavonic tradition is not believed to be derived from the two main Greek textual traditions. It seems to be separate from them, and contains the readings characteristic of both of them.

== Contents ==
In folktale manner in the style of Jewish aggada, it elaborates upon the Book of Job making Job a king. Like many other Testament of ... works in the Old Testament apocrypha, it gives the narrative a framing-tale of Job's last illness, in which he calls together his sons and daughters to give them his final instructions and exhortations. The Testament of Job contains all the characters familiar in the Book of Job, with a more prominent role for Job's wife, given the name Sitidos, and many parallels to Christian beliefs that Christian readers find, such as intercession with God and forgiveness. In this text, Job's first wife dies and the seven sons and three daughters that he had in the epilogue of the book of Job were from his second wife, whom he married after his trials ended. According to the Testament of Job, his second wife is Dinah, the daughter of Jacob. This would mean that not only was Job joined to the house of Israel, but also that Job lived between the death of Abraham and the birth of Moses.

Unlike the Biblical Book of Job, Satan's vindictiveness towards Job is described in the Testament as being due to Job destroying a non-Jewish temple. Indeed, Satan is described in a far more villainous light, rather than simply being a prosecuting counsel. Job is equally portrayed differently; Satan is shown to directly attack Job, but fails each time due to Job's willingness to be patient, unlike the Biblical narrative where Job falls victim but retains faith.

The latter section of the work, dedicated like the Biblical text to Job's comforters, deviates even further from the Biblical narrative. Rather than complaining or challenging God, Job consistently asserts his faith despite the laments of his comforters. While one of the comforters gives up, and the others try to get him medical treatment, Job insists his faith is true, and eventually the voice of God tells the comforters to stop their behaviour. When most of the comforters choose to listen to God's voice, they decide to taunt the one remaining individual who still laments Job's fate.

Unlike many Testament of .... works, there is little concentration on ethical discourses, instead the text concentrates on delivering narrative, as well as embedding a noticeably large number of hymns.

One passage concerns multicoloured cords for women to put around their breasts to enable them to sing in the language of the angels. Some scholars have suggested that this text also shows an interest in glossolalia (speaking in tongues). Indeed, this is an early example of such a phenomenon, although the precedent for this is also found within Judaism and late antique Christianity.

== Composition ==
There has been a general consensus in scholarship that the Testament of Job comes from the Jewish origins because it lacks any clear Christian features. Yet some possibly Christian features have also been noted in the text, such as the use of the Greek compound word ἀπροσωπόληπτός ("impartiality"). After analysing such features in the Testament of Job, Nicholas List concludes that they may be explained as the work of a later Christian scribe or editor.

Although in early scholarship the suggestions were made that the original text was written in Hebrew or Aramaic, there has been a more recent scholarly consensus that the original language of composition of the Testament of Job was Greek.

=== Parallels in Qumran literature ===
Some scholars have noted that the Testament of Job shares some thematic and ideological similarities with the Qumran community. For example, James H. Charlesworth has called attention to the numerous parallels between the Testament of Job and some of the Dead Sea Scrolls. In particular he commented upon a “striking resemblance to the Qumran concept of the fellowship of the just with the angels” as found in the Testament. This refers especially to the ability of Job’s daughters to have access to the language of the angels. Also, according to Charlesworth, “The whole of the hymn against Elihu (TJob 43:4-17), in fact, is replete with Qumran affinities.”

=== Montanists ===
The assertion has been made that the ecstatic speech of the Montanists (a later Christian sect), was another example of speaking in tongues. This has led some scholars, such as Spittler, to suggest that the Montanists may have edited parts of the Testament of Job, adding sections such as these. But Spittler also suggested that this could have been the Therapeutae who were responsible.

The letter ends with a reference to life after death; "It is written that he will rise up with those whom the Lord will reawaken. To our Lord by glory. Amen."

=== Therapeutae ===
It has been suggested that the work originated from the Therapeutae. However, speaking in tongues has not been recorded as a practice of the Therapeutae.

== Apocrypha categorisation ==
At the end of the 5th century, the Testament of Job was relegated to the apocrypha by the Gelasian Decree, concerning canonical and noncanonical books. Subsequently, the Testament of Job was ignored by Roman Catholic writers until it was published in 1833 in the series edited by Angelo Mai (Scriptorum Veterum Nova Collectio Vol. vii, pp. 180–191). Mai's manuscript had a double title: Testament of Job the Blameless, the Conqueror in Many Contests, the Sainted (which seems to be the older title) and The Book of Job Called Jobab, and His Life, and the Transcript of His Testament.

== See also ==
- Book of Job in Byzantine illuminated manuscripts
