= Avith =

Edomite city

Avith ("ruin") was an Edomite city. It was the capital of the Edomite king Hadad ben Bedad. According to the Bible, Hadad ben Bedad was one of the kings of Edom before there were kings in Israel, that is, before the coronation of Saul ("widely" dated around 1025 BCE). Avith is mentioned only twice in the Hebrew Bible: in a list of Edomite kings in Genesis (Genesis 36:35), and in a copy of the same list found in Chronicles (1 Chronicles 1:46). Its location is unknown but presumably it was in what is now southern Israel or Jordan.

== See also ==
- List of rulers of Edom
