= Aya-ramu =

Edomite king

Aya-ramu (Akkadian: a-a-ram-mu, Aya-rāmu or Ayya-rammu or Ilāya-rām) was king of Edom around the year 701 BCE, during the reign of the Assyrian king Sennacherib. A tentative chronology proposed by Edward Lipiński places his rule between c. 710-685 BC. His rule followed that of Qaus-malaka and he was succeeded by Qaus-gabri.

He is mentioned on Sennacherib's Prism in a list of kings of the Levant and Cyprus who paid tribute to Assyria after Sennacherib's campaign in the Levant.
