= Job Mocked by his Wife =

Painting by Georges de La Tour

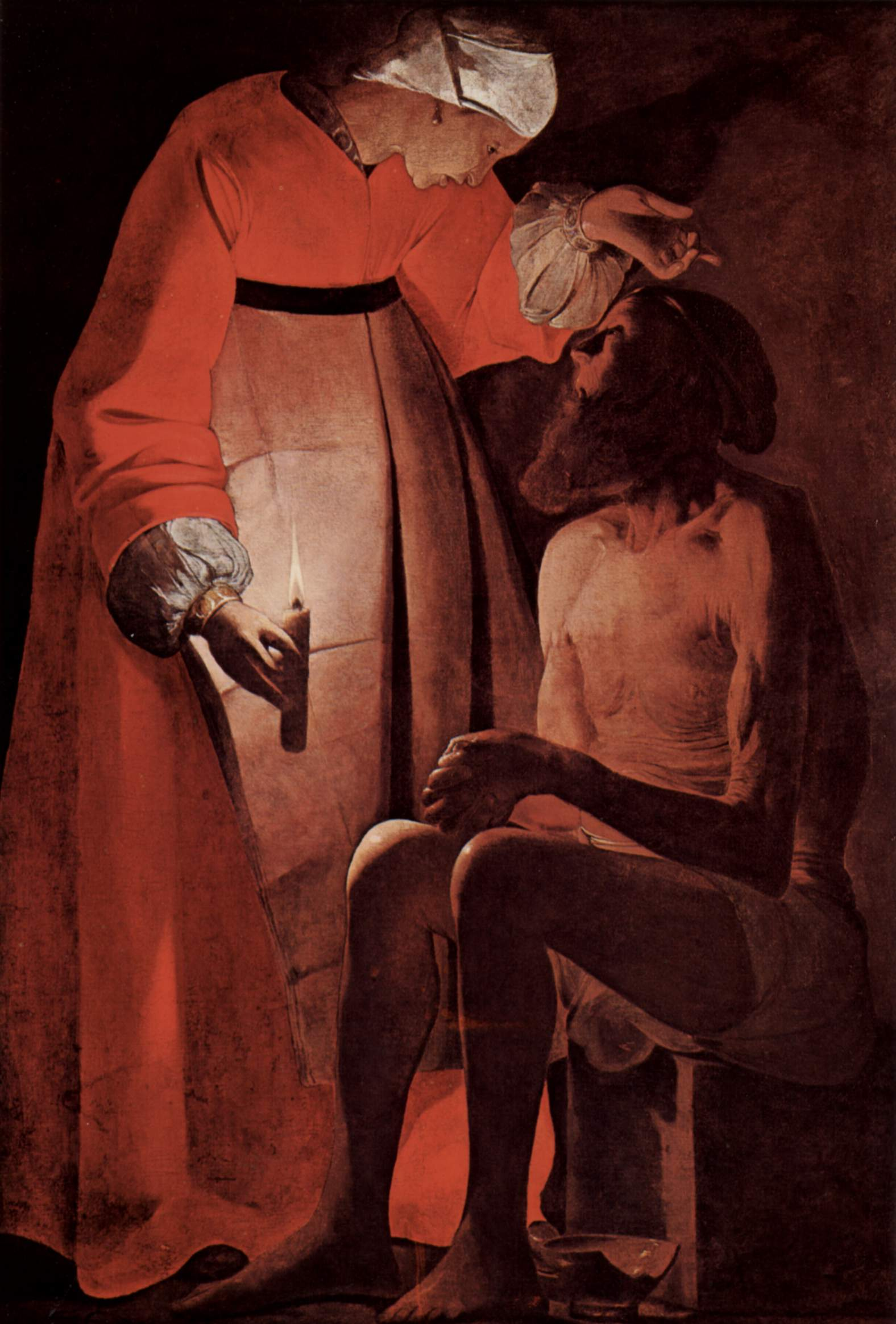

Job Mocked by his Wife is an oil-on-canvas painting by the French artist Georges de La Tour, produced at an unknown date between 1620 and 1650. It depicts a scene from Job 2 in the Old Testament in which Job, a once rich and influential man who in a short space of time lost his children, his possessions and his health but not his piety, is being chided by his wife for maintaining his faith and urged to curse God and die. The painting is now in the Musée départemental d'Art ancien et contemporain in the French town of Épinal.

Originally misattributed to an unknown 17th-century Italian painter, it was acquired by its present owner in 1829 and reattributed to de La Tour in 1922, a reattribution confirmed by a 1972 restoration which revealed the painter's signature.

Charles Sterling argues the work was produced in the painter's youth, but Pierre Rosenberg argues it was produced at the end of his career around 1650.

The painting figures prominently in Muriel Spark’s novella The Only Problem, wherein the protagonist Harvey Gotham, an amateur scholar of the Book of Job, struggles to reconcile the painting’s kindly portrayal of Job’s wife with the harsh words she speaks in Job.
