= Samlah of Masrekah =

Samlah was a king of Edom mentioned in the Hebrew Bible, in Genesis 36:31-43. He succeeded Hadad ben Bedad in the apparently elective kingship of the early Edomites. He is described as being from Masrekah. He was succeeded by Saul of Rehoboth.

The date of his reign is unknown.

Preceded by Hadad ben Bedad	King of Edom	Succeeded by Saul of Rehoboth
