= Hadad (Bible) =

Several biblical figures

Multiple biblical characters with the name Hadad (Hadar) existed.

- Hadad is the name of the Semitic storm god.
- Abraham's son Ishmael had a son named Hadad who was a chief.
- Hadad ben Bedad, an early king of Edom.
- Hadar, the last king of Edom. He ruled from Pau, Edom. Hadad's wife was Queen Mehetabel ("God makes happy"), daughter of Matred and granddaughter of Me-Zahab.
- Hadad the Edomite, a member of the royal house of Edom, who married the sister of Pharaoh's wife, Queen Tahpenes, and escaped from a massacre under Joab, fleeing to Egypt.
