= Dinhabah =

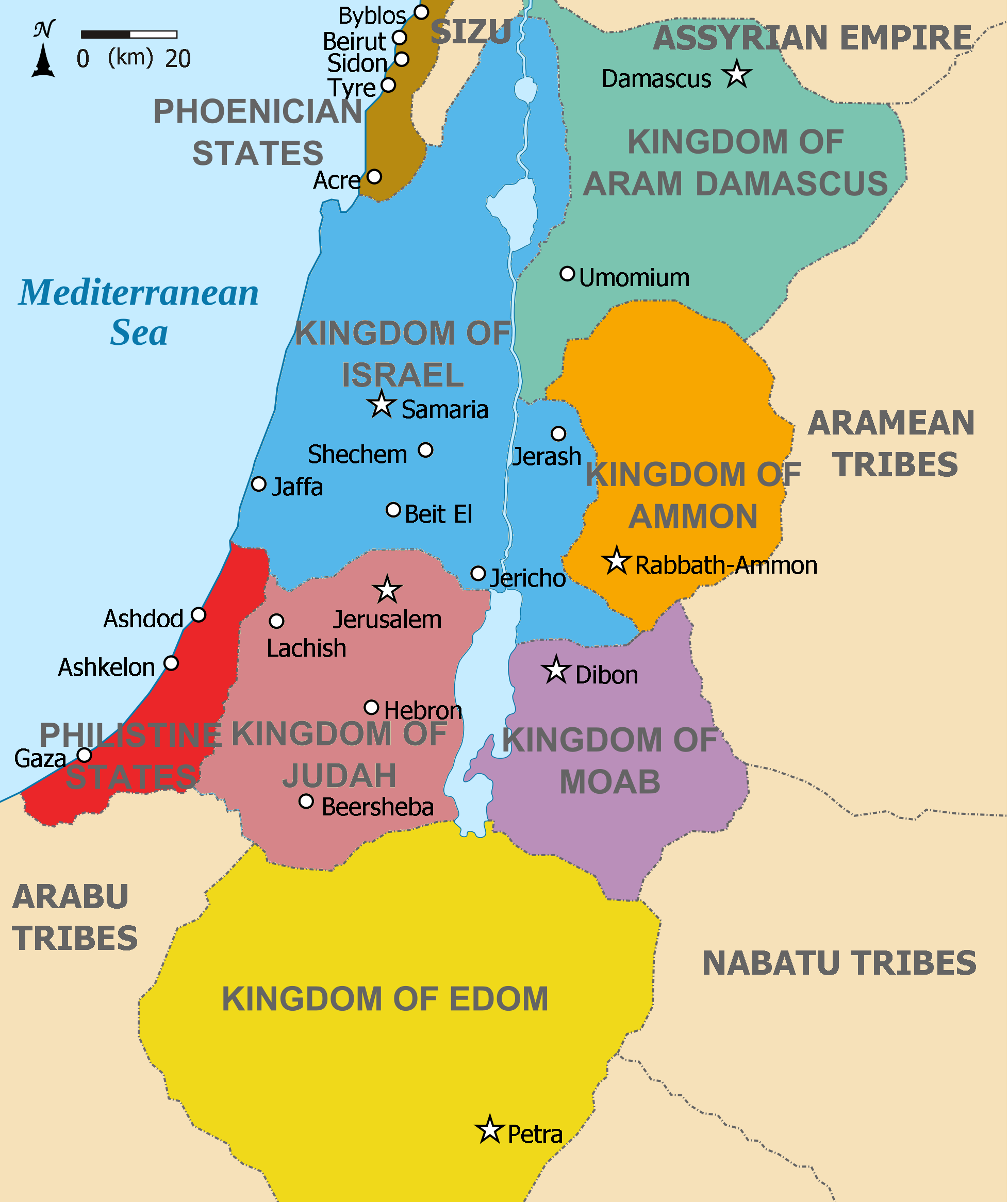
Map of Edom.

Dinhabah was an Edomite city mentioned in Genesis 36, the capital of King Bela ben Beor. The Hebrew name דִּנְהָבָה may mean "robbers' den". Dinhabah may have been located on the site of modern Dibdiba, a little northeast of Petra.

Ptolemy mentions a Danaba (Δανάβα) near Palmyra Syria which was later a bishop's see, and according to Zosimus there was a Danabe (Δανάβη) in Babylonia.
