= Bela ben Beor =

- King of Edom
- Successor: Jobab ben Zerah
- House: Edom
- Father: Beor

Among the Edomite kings of Genesis 36, Bela ben Beor, or Bela the son of Beor, was the first of the apparently elective kings. The dates of his reign are unknown. He came from the city of Dinhabah.

Preceded by None?	King of Edom	Succeeded by Jobab ben Zerah
