= Hadad (son of Bedad) =

Biblical character

Hadad (Hebrew: הֲדַד), son of Bedad (בְּדַד), was a king of Edom mentioned in the Bible, in Genesis 36:31-43. He succeeded Husham in the apparently elective kingship of the Edomites. He is described as having moved the capital of Edom to Avith, and of defeating the Midianites in Moab. He was succeeded by Samlah of Masrekah.

Preceded by Husham	King of Edom	Succeeded by Samlah of Masrekah
