= S. G. De Graaf =

Dutch reformed minister and theologian

Simon Gerrit De Graaf (23 May 1889 – 22 December 1955), known as S. G. De Graaf, was a Dutch Reformed minister and theologian.

De Graaf was a minister of the Reformed Churches in the Netherlands in Amsterdam. Cornelis Veenhof suggests that he "exercised a deeper influence than any one of the Amsterdam professors of theology." De Graaf was associated with Klaas Schilder but did not join him in the formation of the Reformed Churches in the Netherlands (Liberated).

De Graaf is best known for his four volume work, Verbondsgeschiedenis, translated into English as Promise and Deliverance by H. Evan Runner. Al Wolters calls it a "popular guide to reading the Bible in the redemptive-historical way that had been developed or rediscovered in neocalvinism." Sidney Greidanus notes that De Graaf "advocated more emphasis on the covenant both in interpreting and preaching the Word," and suggests that his name is "almost synonymous with the renewed emphasis on the covenant".
