= Jobab ben Zerah =

King of Edom

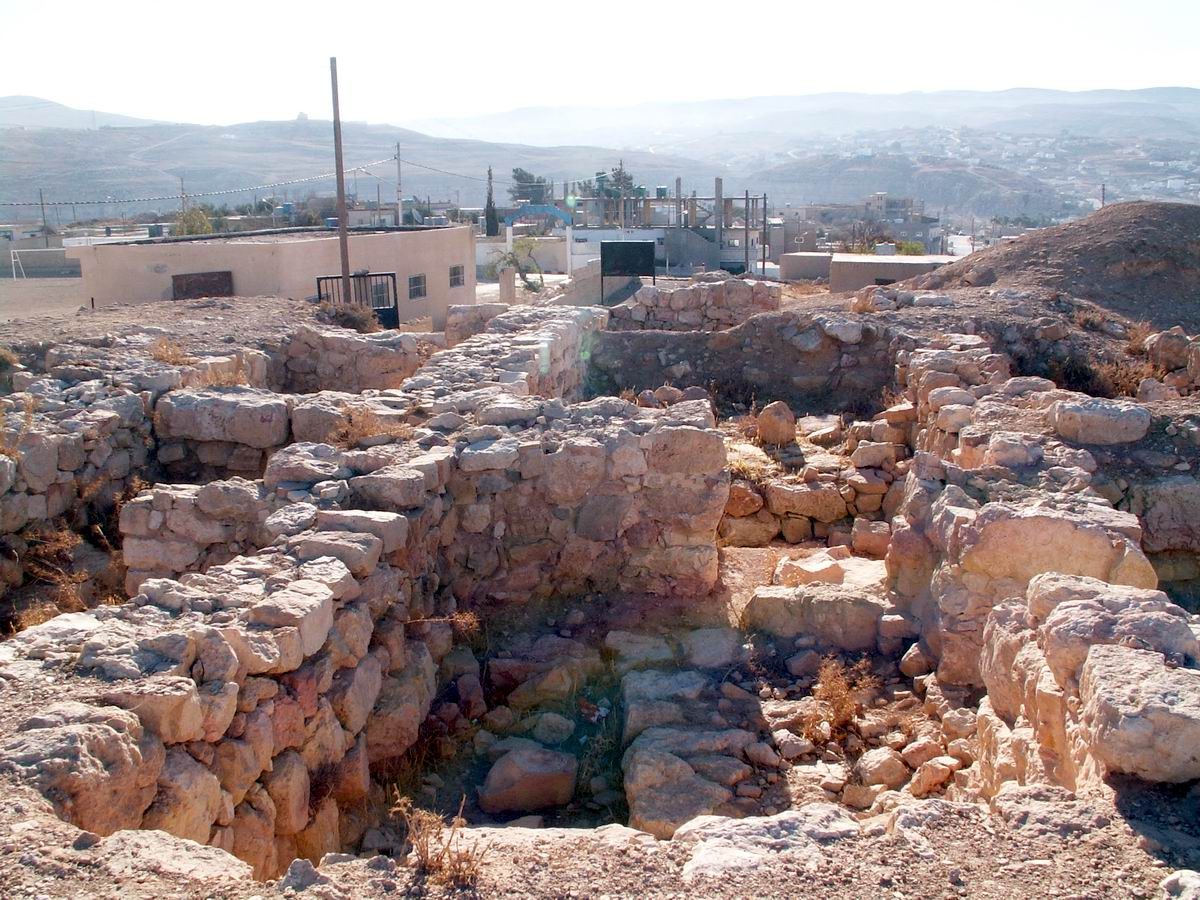
The remains of the Edomite city of Basra at the edge of the village of Buzira

Jobab ben Zerah (Hebrew: יובב בן־זרח Yōḇāḇ ben-Zerah) was a king of ancient Edom, according to Genesis 36. He succeeded Bela ben Beor in the apparently elective kingship of the Edomites. He ruled from Bozrah. He was succeeded by Husham.

Jobab has traditionally often been identified with the biblical figure Job. Job was said to live in the "land of Uz", which was where Edom was located. Job was one of the wealthiest people in the world, and this wealth could easily be explained with his status as royalty. The book of Jasher stated that the Edomites had disallowed themselves from choosing a descendant of Esau for kingship. Jobab began to reign after Bela's 30-year rule.

== Identity as Job ==
The Greek translation of the Hebrew Bible, the Septuagint, identifies Job as Jobab. Also, the oldest English-language Catholic Bible, the Douay-Rheims, identifies Job as Jobab. The Challoner Revision of the Douay-Rheims speculates that Job could have written the book of Job, but the original 1610 Douay-Rheims says that Job himself wrote the book in the Arabic language, which was then translated into Hebrew by Moses. This claim could be supported by St. Jerome, who wrote that the book of Job was written in "Hebrew and Arabic and sometimes Syrian".

Church Slavonic versions of Book of Job and Russian Synodal Bible include a postscript in which Jobab is identified with Job, the anonymous author of the postscript refers to a "Syriac book". Many Bible scholars, such as Douglas Wilson, agree with the identification, though Methodist theologian Adam Clarke maintained a different position. David J. Gibson in his book Whence Came the Hyksos, Kings of Egypt defends the identification based on numerous passages from the Book of Job, personal names, geography, occupation, and contemporaries.

Preceded by Bela ben Beor	King of Edom	Succeeded by Husham
