= Edomite language =

Ancient Semitic language of Edom (Jordan)

Edomite
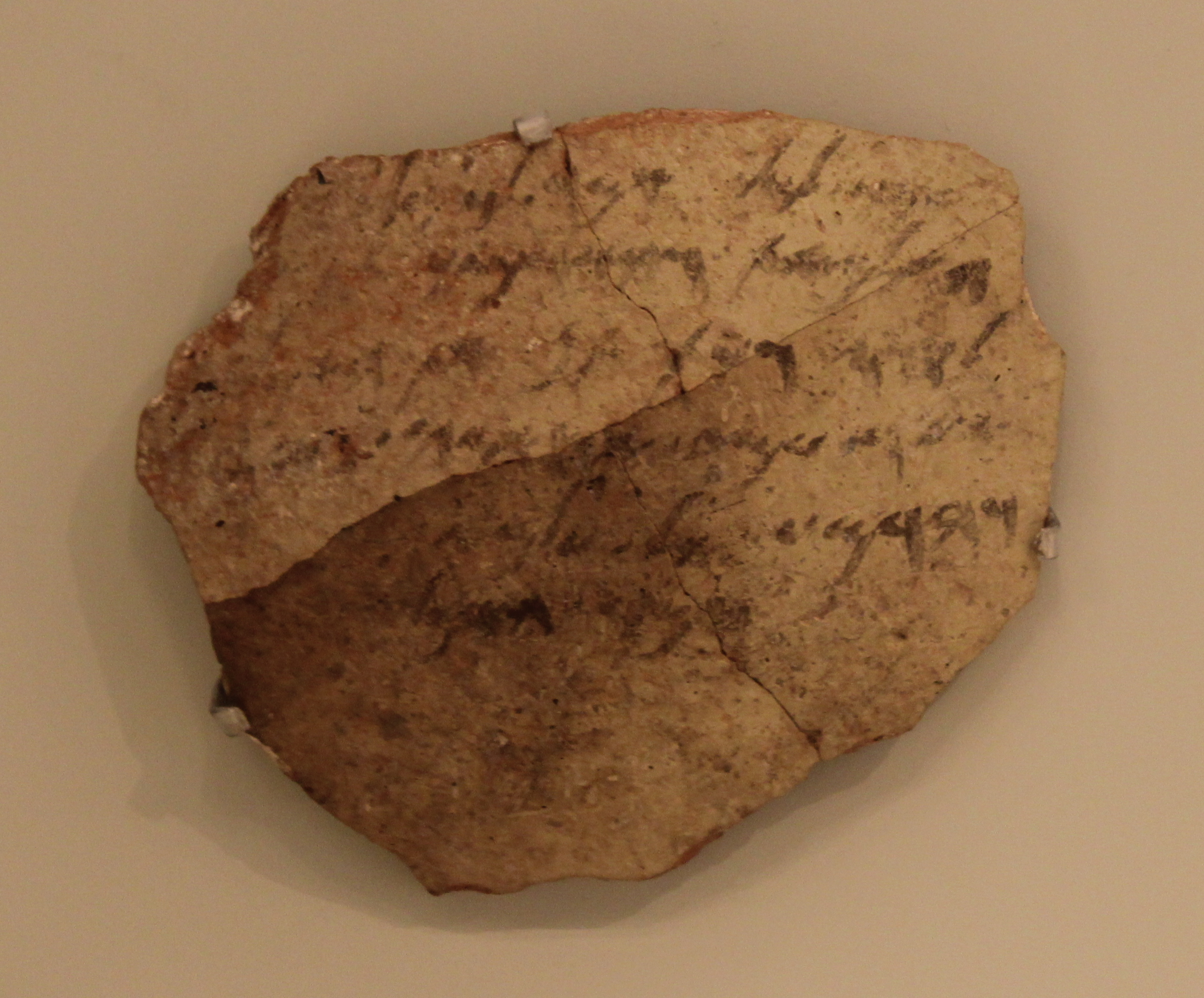
- Ostracon written in the Edomite language dated to the 6th century BC
- Native to: Edom
- Region: Idumea (modern-day southwestern Jordan and southern Israel)
- Ethnicity: Edomites
- Era: early 1st millennium BC
- Language family: Afro-Asiatic: Semitic; West; Central; Northwest; Canaanite; South; Edomite

Language codes
- ISO 639-3: xdm
- Glottolog: edom1234

Edomite was a Northwest Semitic Canaanite language spoken by the Edomites in Idumea (modern-day southwestern Jordan and parts of Israel) in the 2nd and 1st millennium BC. It is extinct and known only from an extremely small corpus, attested in a scant number of impression seals, ostraca, and a single late 7th or early 6th century BC letter, discovered in Horvat Uza.

Like Moabite, but unlike Hebrew, it retained the feminine ending -t in the singular absolute state. In early times, it seems to have been written with a Phoenician alphabet, but by the 6th century BC, it had adopted the Aramaic alphabet. Meanwhile, Aramaic or Arabic features such as whb ("gave") and tgr/tcr ("merchant") entered the language, with whb becoming especially common in proper names.

Like many other Canaanite languages, Edomite features a prefixed definite article derived from the presentative particle (for example as in h-ʔkl ‘the food’). The diphthong /aw/ contracted to /o/ between the 7th and 5th century BC, as foreign transcriptions of the divine name "Qos" indicate a transition in pronunciation from Qāws to Qôs.

== Examples ==
Edomite as transcribed in Square script	Reconstructed transliteration (per Ahituv 2008)	Translation
אמר למלך אמר לבלבל	ʾōmēr lammeleḵ ʾĕmōr ləḆīlbēl	(Thus) said to the king: Say to Bilbel,
השלם את והברכתך	hăšālōm ʾattā wəhīḇraḵəttīḵā	"Are you well?" and "I bless you
לקוס ועת תן את האכל	ləQōs wəʿattā tēn ʾet hāʾoḵel	by Qos." And now give the food
[ ] אשר עמד אחאמה	ʾăšer ʿīmmaḏ ʾĂḥīʾīmmō [...]	that Ahi'immoh [...]
והרם ש[א]ל על מז[בח קוס	wəhērīm Šā[ʾu]l ʿal mīz[baḥ Qōs	And may Sa[u]l lift [it] (up) upon (the) al[tar of Qos,
פן י]חמד האכל	pen ye]ḥmad hāʾoḵel	lest] the food become leavened
