= Teman (Edom) =

Edomite clan and an ancient biblical town of northwest Arabia

Teman (Biblical Hebrew: תֵּימָן, romanized: Tēmān, lit. 'South') was the name of an Edomite clan and of its eponym, according to the Hebrew Bible in Genesis 36:11–43. The term means "south" and was later applied to Yemen due to its location at the southern end of the Arabian Peninsula, so Yemenite Jews are called Temanim in Modern Hebrew. The Arabic name Yaman is from the same Semitic root.

In Genesis 36:15, Teman is a son of Eliphaz, Esau's eldest son. Job's friend Eliphaz is descended from Teman in Job 2:11.

== In Kuntillet Ajrud inscription ==
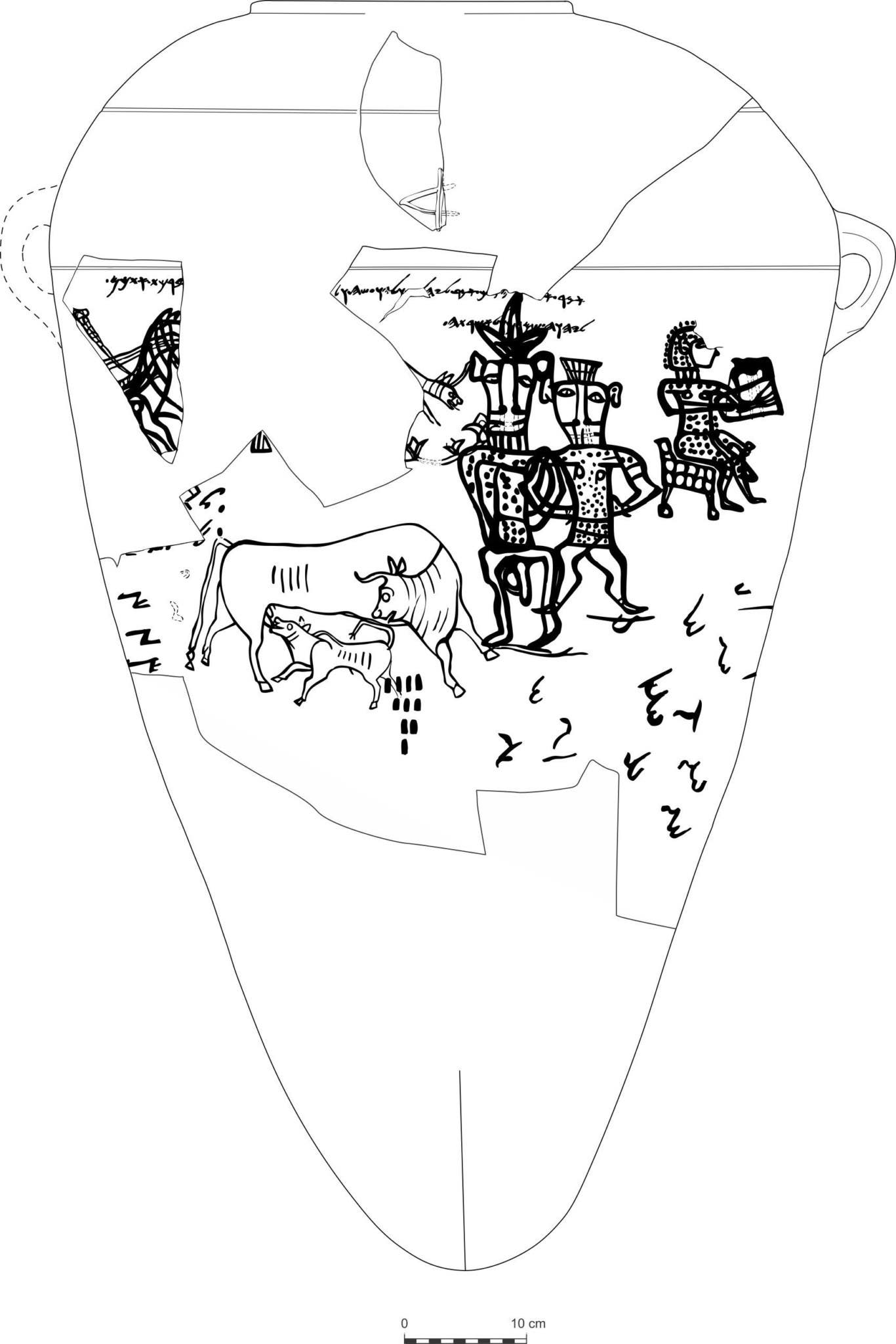
Part of the Kuntillet Ajrud inscriptions: Pithos A

The Kuntillet Ajrud inscriptions in the Sinai Peninsula, dated to the 9th century BCE, use Tēmān as a place name.

brktk lyhwh tmn wlʾšrth
I bless you to Yahweh of Teman and his asherah

It is unclear if "his asherah" refers directly to Asherah, the consort of Yahweh, or to the ritual items known as asherah poles. An image on Pithos A from the site shows a couple interpreted as Yahweh and Asherah with a female aurochs and calf on one side and a scribe on the other.

== Location ==
=== In Late Roman period ===
Eusebius' Onomasticon knows a district in the Gebalene region called Theman, and also a town with the same name, occupied by a Roman garrison, 15 miles from Petra. Unfortunately no indication of direction is given. No trace of the name has yet been found. It may have been on the road from Elath to Bozrah.

=== Possible location in modern Jordan ===
The exact location of Teman remains unknown, but there is a possibility that if the city of Teman ever existed as a more permanent location of shepherds during the time of Job, present-day Ma'an (Arabic: معان) in Jordan could be its successor. The possible location of Teman given by bibleatlas.org is in the vicinity of the Jordanian town Ma'an.

There is other strong evidence that Teman could be identified in the site of the modern Ma'an. There is some information that says that the state which emerged in the south of the Arabian Peninsula in Yemen during the year 1200 BC extended its influence in the north and made the city of Ma'an a commercial and political center. The city acquired a gloss because of the abundance of its waters and this is true because we can assume it from the large number of springs and their ongoing. That time any residential community surrounded by a desert was built around water sources. The glitter of the site could be interpreted by its position as it became a stop of migratory convoys between the Arabian Peninsula and the Levant, which were going there due to their need for the supply of water and food and to take a rest.

== Significance in Hebrew Bible ==
The inhabitants of Teman seem to have been famous for their wisdom (Jeremiah 49:7, Book of Obadiah 1:8). Eliphaz the Temanite was chief of the comforters of Job (2:11, etc.). The manner in which the city is mentioned by the prophets, now by itself, and again as standing for Edom, shows how important it must have been in their time.

According to some biblical scholars and commentators, Teman was a city in the Land of Uz. In "The Comprehensive Commentary on the Holy Bible" it is written: "Throughout almost the whole of Hebrew history Uz or Idumea was regarded by the Jews in the same light of elegance and accomplishment, as Greece by the Romans, and Teman, the native city of Eliphaz, as the Athens of Arabia Petrea".

The Jewish Encyclopedia points out that the biblical genealogy and the references of the name "Teman": "proves that Teman was one of the most important of the Edomite tribes, and this is confirmed by the fact that "Teman" is used as a synonym for Edom itself (Amos i. 12; Obad. 9; comp. Jer. xlix. 20, 22; Hab. iii. 3). The Temanites were famed for their wisdom (Jer. xlix. 7; Baruch iii. 22)".
