= Kaus-malaka =

Ḳaus-malaka (Akkadian: 𒋡𒍑𒈠𒆷𒅗 Qauš-malaka; Edomite: 𐤒𐤅𐤎𐤌𐤋𐤊 Qāws-melek or Qāws-malāk) was the king of Udumi (Edom) during the reign of the Assyrian king Tiglath-Pileser III. His name references the deity Qaus and can be translated as "Qaus is king" (-melek) or "Qaus rules" (-malek). He was an enemy of Ahaz of Judah, and ruled alongside other east-Palestinian client kings such as Salamanu of Moab and Sinipu of Bit-Ammon. All of these rulers paid tribute to the Neo-Assyrian empire in 732 BC.
