= Edom =

Ancient kingdom in the southern Levant

Kingdom of Edom 𐤀𐤃𐤌
- c. 13th century BC – c. 553 BC
- A theoretical map of Canaan around 830 BCE. Edom is in yellow.
- Status: Monarchy
- Capital: Bozrah
- Common languages: Edomite
- Religion: Canaanite religion
- Demonym: Edomites
- History
  - Established: c. 13th century BC
  - Conquered by the Babylonian king Nabonidus: c. 553 BC
- Today part of: Israel; Jordan; West Bank

Edom (Note: /ˈiːdəm/; Edomite: 𐤀𐤃𐤌, romanized: ʾdm, lit. 'man'; Hebrew: אֱדוֹם, romanized: ʾĔḏōm, lit. 'red'; Arabic: إدوم, romanized: ʾidūm; Neo-Assyrian Akkadian: 𒆳𒌑𒁺𒈬, romanized: Udūmu; Ancient Egyptian: 𓇋𓀁𓂧𓐰𓏲𓅖𓌙𓈉, romanized: jdwmꜥ)) was an ancient kingdom that stretched across areas in the south of present-day Israel, Jordan, and Palestine. Edom and the Edomites appear in several written sources relating to the late Bronze Age and to the Iron Age in the Levant, including the list of the Egyptian pharaoh Seti I from c. 1215 BC as well as in the chronicle of a campaign by Ramesses III (r. 1186–1155 BC), and the Hebrew Bible.

Archaeological investigation has shown that the nation flourished between the 13th and the 8th centuries BC and was destroyed after a period of decline in the 6th century BC by the Babylonians. After the fall of the kingdom of Edom, the Edomites were pushed westward towards southern Judah by nomadic tribes coming from the east; among them were the Nabataeans, who first appeared in the historical annals of the 4th century BC and had already established their own kingdom in what used to be Edom by the first half of the 2nd century BC. More recent excavations show that the process of Edomite settlement in the southern parts of Judah and parts of the Negev down to Timna had started already before the destruction of the kingdom by Nebuchadnezzar II in 587/86 BC, both by peaceful penetration and by military means and taking advantage of the already-weakened state of Judah.

Once pushed out of their territory, the Edomites settled during the Persian period in an area comprising the southern hills of Judea down to the area north of Be'er Sheva. The people appear under a Greek form of their old name, as Idumeans or Idumaeans, and their new territory was called Idumea or Idumaea (Greek: Ἰδουμαία, Idoumaía; Latin: Idūmaea), a term that was used in the Hellenistic and Roman periods, also mentioned in the New Testament. During the 2nd century BC Hasmoneans, the Edomites either began or resumed following Jewish law and were subsumed into the larger Jewish population; Herod the Great was of Edomite origin. Whether this conversion was voluntary or forced is a matter of debate among scholars, as is the relationship between Edomite religion and Judaism, which were closely related.

Edom and Idumea are two related but distinct terms; they relate to a historically-contiguous population but to two separate, though adjacent, territories which the Edomites/Idumeans occupied in different periods of their history. The Edomites first established a kingdom ("Edom") in the southern area of modern-day Jordan and later migrated into the southern parts of the Kingdom of Judah ("Idumea", modern-day Mount Hebron) when Judah was first weakened and then destroyed by the Babylonians in the 6th century BC.

== Name ==
The Semitic root of Edom is 'dm meaning "man" (whence "Adam") and "red". Its semantic extensions include "earth" (adam-at) and "deserts".

The Hebrew Bible or Tanakh writes of Esau, the elder son of the Hebrew patriarch Isaac, that he was born "red all over". As a young adult, he sold his birthright to his brother Jacob for a portion of "red pottage". The Bible describes the Edomites as descendants of Esau: Genesis 36:1 reads "Now this is the genealogy of Esau, who is Edom", and Genesis 36:9 reads "And this is the genealogy of Esau the father of the Edomites ...".

== Ancient history ==
=== Edom ===
The Edomites may have been connected with the Shasu and Shutu, nomadic raiders mentioned in Egyptian sources. Indeed, a letter from an Egyptian scribe at a border fortress in the Wadi Tumilat during the reign of Merneptah reports movement of nomadic "shasu-tribes of Edom" to watering holes in Egyptian territory. The earliest Iron Age settlements—possibly copper mining camps—date to the 11th century BC. Settlement intensified by the late 8th century BC, and the main sites so far excavated have been dated between the 8th and 6th centuries BC. The last unambiguous reference to Edom is an Assyrian inscription of 667 BC. Edom ceased to exist as a state when it was conquered by Nabonidus in the 6th century BC.

Edom is mentioned in Assyrian cuneiform inscriptions in the form 𒌑𒁺𒈪 Údumi and 𒌑𒁺𒈬 Údumu; three of its kings are known from the same source: Kaus-malaka at the time of Tiglath-pileser III (c. 745 BC), Aya-ramu at the time of Sennacherib (c. 705 BC), and Kaus-gabri at the time of Esarhaddon (c. 680 BC). According to the Egyptian inscriptions, the "Aduma" at times extended their possessions to the borders of Egypt.

The existence of the Kingdom of Edom was asserted by archaeologists led by Ezra Ben-Yosef and Tom Levy, by using a methodology called the punctuated equilibrium model in 2019. Archaeologists mainly took copper samples from Timna Valley and Faynan in Jordan's Arava valley dated to 1300–800 BC. According to the results of the analysis, the researchers thought that Pharaoh Shoshenk I of Egypt (the Biblical "Shishak"), who attacked Jerusalem in the 10th century BC, encouraged the trade and production of copper instead of destroying the region. Tel Aviv University professor Ben Yosef stated "Our new findings contradict the view of many archaeologists that the Arava was populated by a loose alliance of tribes, and they're consistent with the biblical story that there was an Edomite kingdom here."

Khirbat en-Nahas is a large-scale copper-mining site excavated by archaeologist Thomas Levy in what is now southern Jordan. The scale of mining on the site is regarded as evidence of a strong, centralized 10th century BC Edomite kingdom.

=== Idumaea ===
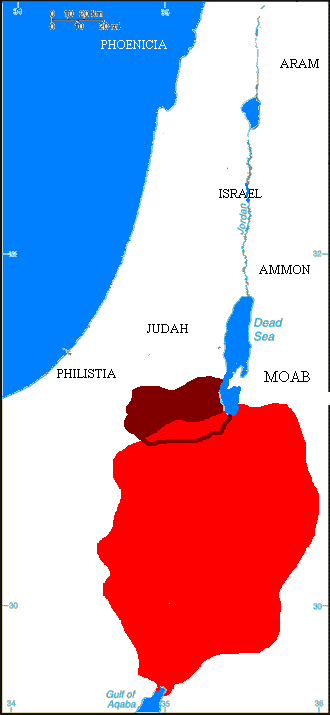
Map showing kingdom of Edom (in red) at its largest extent, c. 600 BC. Areas in dark red show the approximate boundary of classical-age Idumaea.

After the conquest of Judah by the Babylonians, Edomites settled in the region of Hebron. They prospered in this new country, called by the Greeks and Romans "Idumaea" or "Idumea", for more than four centuries. Strabo, writing around the time of Jesus, held that the Idumaeans, whom he identified as of Nabataean origin, constituted the majority of the population of western Judea, where they commingled with the Judaeans and adopted their customs, a view shared by some modern scholarly works, which consider these Idumaeans as of Arab, possibly Nabataean, stock. This claim has been challenged by historians, however, as many also argue the Edomites not Arab through various different markers, most notably in how the Edomite language was most similar to Biblical Hebrew and Moabite than Classical or Nabataean Arabic, with the Nabataean Arabs having displaced rather than absorbed or originated the Edomites. The Idumean onomasticon catalogued in ostraca found in southern Palestine and dated to the 4th century BCE reveals a preponderance of Arabic names ending in waw and characterized as "proto-Nabataean".

== Classical Idumaea ==
=== Persian period ===
In the late 5th century BC, the Qedarite confederacy, headed by Geshem the Arab, were prominent players in the administration of the territory of southern Judea and Transjordan. Compared to the neighboring Moabites and Ammonites, the name "Edom" completely disappeared from the area east of Arabah. The Qedarite king of the Arabs had allied with Egyptian forces during their campaign into Palestine and Phoenicia in 387, challenging Persian dominance in the region. A Persian counterattack launched in 385 ended with the dissolution of the Qedarite kingdom and the creation of a truncated province of Idumea by 365.

According to ostraca from sites in Idumaea (i.e. southern Judah after the fall of the kingdom to the Babylonians, dating mainly to the 4th century BCE), a diverse population of Arabs, Edomites as well as Judeans and Phoenicians inhabited the area during the late Persian period. Strabo identifies Idumeans with the Nabateans who were expelled to southern Judea after committing sedition. However, there is evidence for cultural continuity between the Iron Age Edom and Idumea, based on settlement patterns and religious practices.

=== Hellenistic period ===
The first mention of Idumea in extra-biblical sources comes from Diodorus who describes it alternately as an eparchy and a satrapy while chronicling the campaigns of Antigonus' forces against the Nabateans in 312/311 BC. The region they inhabit in this period is described as being centered around the Dead Sea, to the west of Wadi Arabah and south of Judah, with Israel's Negev lying to the south.

During the Hellenistic period, both Jews and Idumeans spoke Aramaic and used it for literary and legal documents. An Idumean marriage contract from Maresha, dating from 176 BCE, closely resembles the ketubbot used by Jews. However, despite these cultural similarities, some Jews maintained a distinct boundary between themselves and the Idumeans. This is evident in Ben Sira 50:25–26, which expresses disdain for three "nations," including "the inhabitants of Se'ir", referring to the Edomites/Idumeans.

During the revolt of the Maccabees against the Seleucid kingdom (early 2nd century BCE), II Maccabees refers to a Seleucid general named Gorgias as "governor of Idumaea"; whether he was a Greek or a Hellenized Idumean is unknown. Some scholars maintain that the reference to Idumaea in that passage is an error altogether.

According to Josephus, the Judeans under Judas Maccabeus first defeated the Idumaeans in the two Idumaean border towns of Hebron and Marisa and plundered them around 163 BC. About 50 years later, Judeans under John Hyrcanus I again attacked Marisa and the nearby Adoraim: according to Josephus and Ammonius Grammaticus, Hyrcanus conquered the cities of Marisa and Adoraim, forcibly converted all Idumaeans to Judaism and incorporated them into the Jewish nation:

Hyrcanus also captured the Idumean cities of Adora and Marisa and after subduing all the Idumeans, permitted them to remain in their country as long as they had themselves circumcised and were willing to observe the laws of the Jews. And so, out of attachment to the land of their fathers, they submitted to circumcision and to make their manner of life conform in all other respects to that of the Jews. And from that time onward they have continued to be Jews.

Jewish nationalist historians, starting with Heinrich Graetz in the 19th century, have been uneasy with the forced conversion of Idumaea. Since the late 1980s, some scholars have questioned the traditional account of Idumaea's conquest and forced conversion by the Hasmoneans. Several reasons have been proposed for this skepticism. (Note: In detail: 1. While Strabo also reports that the Idumeans "joined the Judeans and shared in the same customs with them," he makes no mention of coercion, which was generally rare in antiquity.; 2. The Idumeans most probably did already practice circumcision, like most Arab peoples, a fact that has been corroborated archaeologically through the discovery of circumcised stone phalli excavated at Maresha.; 3. Recent archaeological findings have revealed that Mikvaot (ritual baths), long considered evidence that the Idumeans indeed adopted Jewish customs after conversion, were actually used by the Idumeans even earlier than by the Judeans. This suggests that, rather than the Idumeans adopting Jewish laws, the influence may have flowed in the opposite direction. Additionally, other practices, such as the use of ritually purified vessels, specific burial customs, pork avoidance, and cultic aniconism further support this idea.; 4. Excavations indicate that nearly all Idumaean settlements were not conquered, nor did the Idumeans remain in their land "out of attachment for it," as Josephus claims. Instead, nearly all Idumaean sites were abandoned during the Hasmonean period, mostly without evidence of conflict.; 5. Exceptions: Khirbet er-Rasm, possibly Maresha and Lachish (where, however, at least Josephus's chronology is incorrect according to Finkielsztejn); all at Idumaea's northern border. Probably not Arad (in the south): Both Faust (followed by van Maaren), who suggests a Hasmonean conquest of Stratum IV, and Shatzman, who speculates that the unfinished construction project started in Stratum IV could have been a Hasmonean endeavor, fail to take into account Herzog's latest excavation report, which attributes the destruction of the 3rd century Stratum IV to an earthquake, as suggested by the damaged water systems here and in the surrounding area.; 6. External image; Altar of Qos in Mamre Both archaeological and historical evidence – namely, Josephus' report of an Idumaean named Costobarus, from a family of Qos priests, whom Herod appointed as governor of Idumaea and Philistia, but who purportedly rebelled against Herod by promoting the Qos faith, and the presence of a Herodian Qos sanctuary in Mamre – suggest that the Idumeans were not fully integrated into Judaism even after the Hasmonean era, but that the Idumeans who repopulated Idumaea after the Hasmonean period continued to practice the Idumean religion.; 7. Furthermore, the parallel account of the conquest and forced conversion of the Itureans is now widely considered fictional, with even clearer archaeological evidence than in the case of Idumaea. Similarly, in other regions, where Josephus reports a conquest without conversion, archaeology also fails to support Josephus's narrative.) As a result, historians have toned down the Hasmonean history of Idumaea as recounted by Josephus in several ways. Most historians still maintain that the events happened largely as Josephus describes.

This view was first moderated by the assumption that only Maresha and Adoraim, located on Idumaea's northern border, were actually conquered, while other Idumeans voluntarily aligned themselves with the Judeans. The reports of forced conversions, in this view, are either anti-Hasmonean propaganda or, conversely, Hasmonean propaganda, which Josephus (mistakenly) incorporated into his historical work. Atkinson takes this further by considering the entire account of the conquest to be fictional.He also believes that "many Idumeans [...] never fully embraced Judaism."

However, while Atkinson still maintains that archaeology suggests "the region south of Judea [including Maresha] was annexed without any significant conflict," Berlin and Kosmin now argue that even the annexation of Idumea and the Idumeans into the Judean state is fictional, noting that, as corroborated by archaeology, after most Idumaeans left Idumaea, Judeans did not settle in this abandoned area. In line with this interpretation, it is now often assumed that Idumaea was not annexed by the Hasmoneans at all. Instead, the remaining Idumeans may have entered into an alliance with the Judeans, within which the Idumaean religion could continue to be practiced.

This reinterpretation leaves the prior depopulation of Idumaea as an open question, comparable to the simultaneous depopulation of Galilee and Philistia.

=== Herodian dynasty ===
Antipater the Idumaean, the progenitor of the Herodian dynasty along with Judean progenitors that ruled Judea after the Roman conquest, was of Idumean origin. Under Herod the Great, the Idumaea province was ruled for him by a series of governors, among whom were his brother Joseph ben Antipater and his brother-in-law Costobarus.

Overall, Herodian influence on Judea, Jerusalem and the Temple was significant. However, this was obfuscated by later variants of Second Temple Judaism and Rabbinic Judaism. For example, a minority of contemporary Jews argued Herod could not be Jewish because of his genealogical origins. These beliefs were promoted by works such as Jubilees and 4QMMT, which were of Essene, Hasidean or Sadducee origin. These Jews did not openly express their views because Herod violently suppressed critics. Evie Gassner believed the sages disparaged Herod because he supported the Sadducees, who opposed the Pharisees.

By 66 CE, during the First Jewish–Roman War, the Zealot leader Simon bar Giora attacked the Jewish converts of Upper Idumaea and brought near complete destruction to the surrounding villages and countryside in that region. It was part of his wider plan to attack Jerusalem and seize authority for himself. According to Josephus, during the siege of Jerusalem in 70 CE by Titus, 20,000 Idumaeans, under the leadership of John, Simon, Phinehas, and Jacob, joined the Zealots as they besieged the Temple. Idumean zealotry arguably reflected their attempts to 'prove' their Jewishness. After the Jewish–Roman wars, the Idumaean people disappear from written history, though the geographical region of "Idumea" is still referred to at the time of Jerome.

In some Jewish traditions stemming from the Talmud, the descendants of Esau are the Romans (and to a larger extent, all Europeans).

== Written records ==
=== Hebrew Bible ===
Esau is described as "the father of the Edomites". The Edomites' original country, according to the Hebrew Bible, stretched from the Sinai Peninsula as far as Kadesh Barnea. It reached as far south as Eilat, the seaport of Edom. On the north of Edom was the territory of Moab.

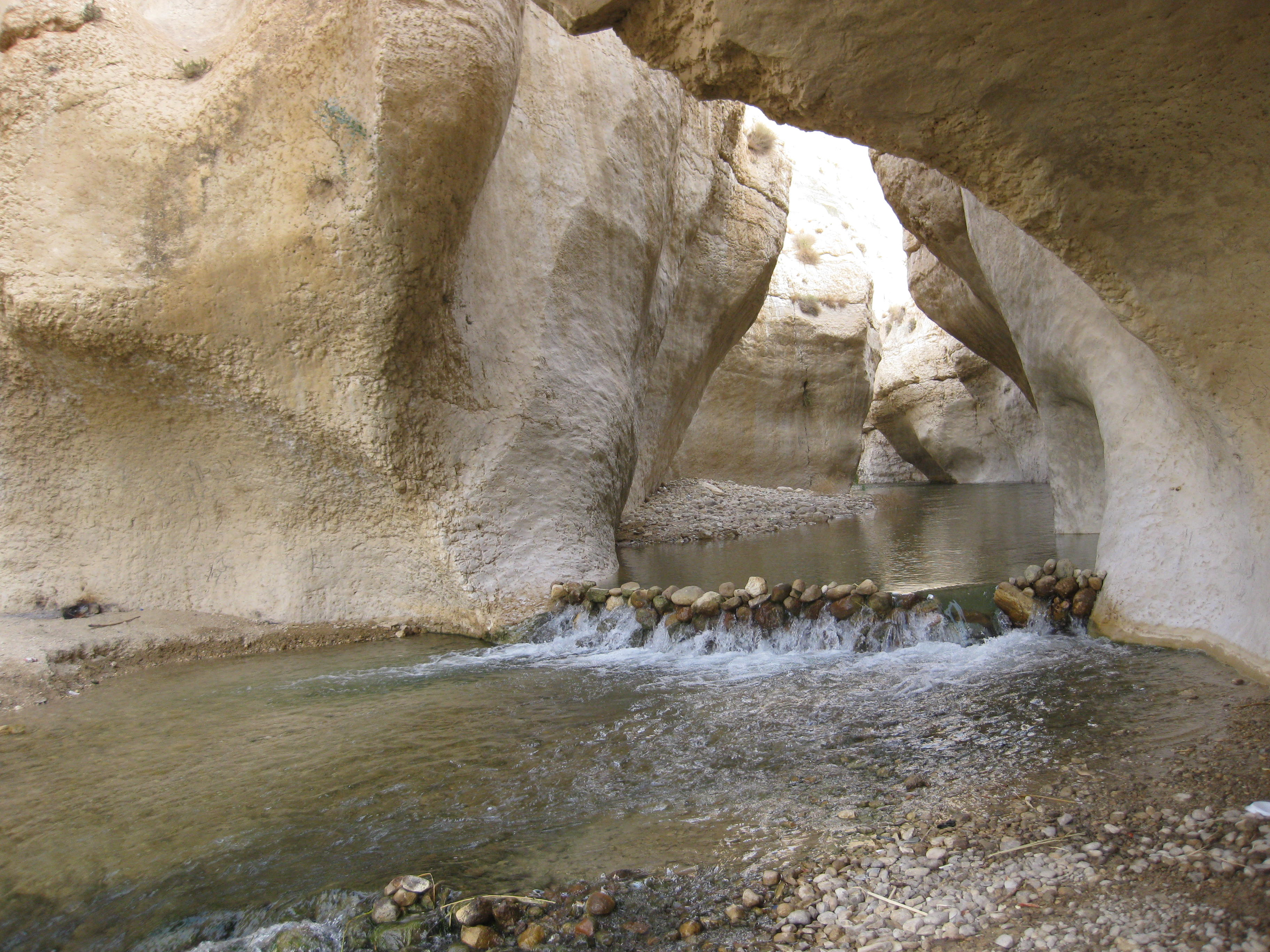
The limestone waterfall of the Zered, now called the Wadi al-Hasa

The boundary between Moab and Edom was the Zered, now called Wadi al-Hasa. The ancient capital of Edom was Bozrah, now Busaira, Jordan. According to the Book of Genesis, Esau's descendants settled in the land after they had displaced the Horites. It was also called the land of Seir; Mount Seir appears to have been strongly identified with them and may have been a cultic site. According to biblical narrative, at the time of King Amaziah of Judah (796–769 BC), Selah was its principal stronghold, Eilat and Ezion-Geber its seaports.

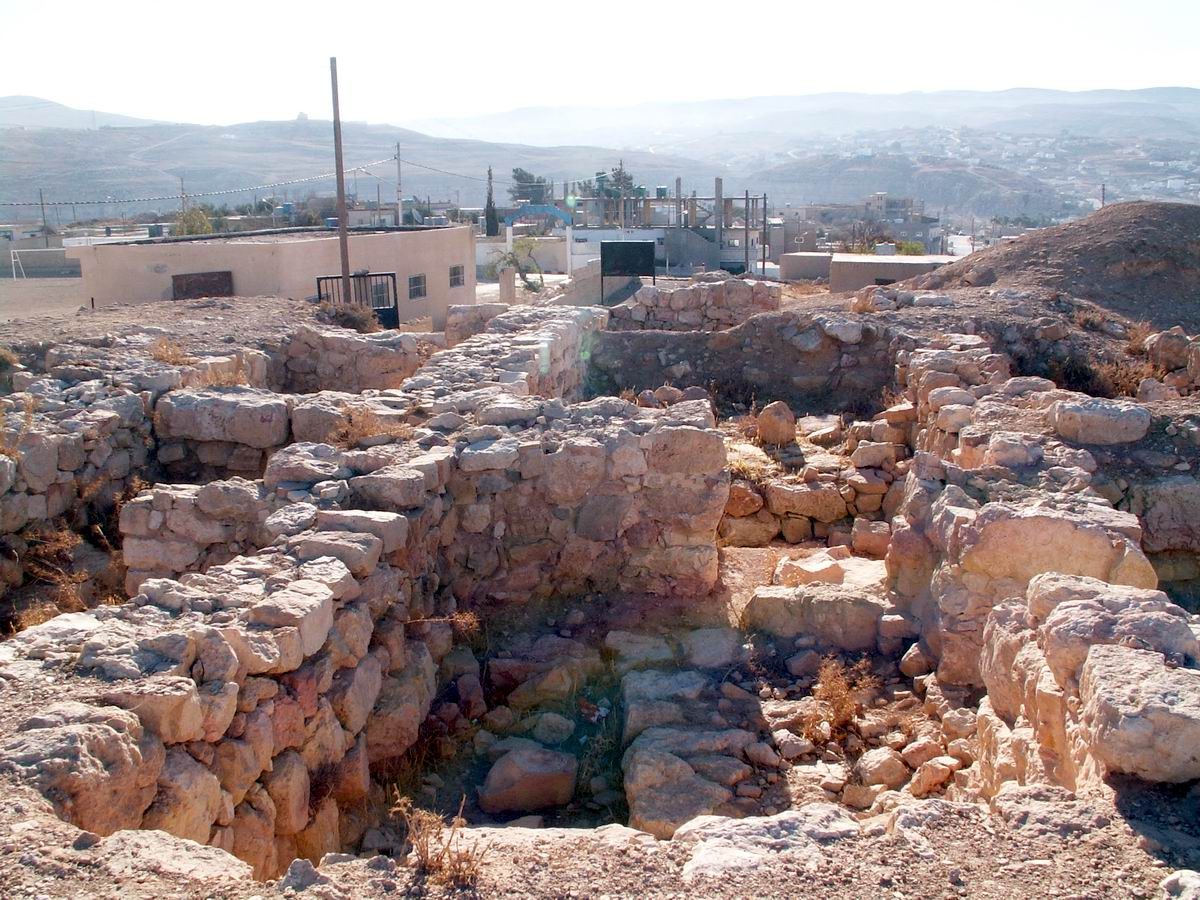
Busaira archaeological site, the former capital Bozra of Edom

Genesis 36:31–43 lists the kings of Edom "before any Israelite king reigned":

These are the kings who reigned in the land of Edom before any king reigned over the Israelites.

Bela son of Beor reigned in Edom, and the name of his city was Dinhabah.
When Bela died, Jobab son of Zerah, from Bozrah, succeeded him as king.
When Jobab died, Husham of the land of the Temanites succeeded him as king.
When Husham died, Hadad son of Bedad, who defeated the Midianites in the country of Moab, succeeded him as king; the name of his city was Avith.
When Hadad died, Samlah of Masrekah succeeded him as king.
When Samlah died, Saul of Rehoboth-on-the-river succeeded him as king.
When Saul died, Baal-hanan son of Achbor succeeded him as king.
And when Baal-hanan son of Achbor died, Hadar succeeded him as king; the name of his city was Pau, and his wife’s name was Mehetabel daughter of Matred daughter of Me-zahab.

These are the names of the clans of Esau, each with its families and locality, name by name: the clans Timnah, Alvah, Jetheth, Aholibamah, Elah, Pinon, Kenaz, Teman, Mibzar, Magdiel, and Iram. Those are the clans of Edom—that is, of Esau, father of the Edomites—by their settlements in the land which they hold.

The Hebrew word translated as leader of a clan is aluf, used solely to describe the dukes of Edom and Moab in the Torah. However, beginning in the books of the later prophets, the word is used to describe Judean generals; for example, in the prophecies of the Book of Zechariah twice (9:7, 12:5–6), it had evolved to describe Jewish captains. The word is also used multiple times as a general term for teacher or guide, for example, in Psalm 55:13.

If the account may be taken at face value, the kingship of Edom was, at least in early times, not hereditary, perhaps elective. The First Book of Chronicles mentions both a king and chieftains. Moses and the Israelite people twice appealed to their common ancestry and asked the king of Edom for passage through his land, along the "King's Highway", on their way to Canaan, but the king refused permission. Accordingly, they detoured around the country because of his show of force or because God ordered them to do so rather than wage war (Deuteronomy 2:4–6). The king of Edom did not attack the Israelites, though he prepared to resist aggression.

Nothing further is recorded of the Edomites in the Tanakh until their defeat by King Saul of Israel in the late 11th century BC (1 Samuel 14:47). Forty years later King David and his general Joab defeated the Edomites in the "Valley of Salt" (probably near the Dead Sea; 2 Samuel 8:13–14; 1 Kings 9:15–16). An Edomite prince named Hadad escaped and fled to Egypt, and after David's death he returned and tried to start a rebellion but failed and went to Syria (Aramea). From that time Edom remained a vassal of Israel. David placed over the Edomites Israelite governors or prefects, and this form of government seems to have continued under Solomon. When Israel divided into two kingdoms Edom became a dependency of the Kingdom of Judah. In the time of Jehoshaphat (c. 870 – 849 BC) the Tanakh mentions a king of Edom who was probably an Israelite deputy appointed by the King of Judah. It also states that the inhabitants of Mount Seir invaded Judea in conjunction with Ammon and Moab, and that the invaders turned against one another and were all destroyed (2 Chronicles 20:10–23). Edom revolted against Jehoram and elected a king of its own (2 Kings 8:20–22; 2 Chronicles 21:8). Amaziah attacked and defeated the Edomites, seizing Selah, but the Israelites never subdued Edom completely (2 Kings 14:7; 2 Chronicles 25:11–12).

In the time of Nebuchadnezzar II the Edomites may have helped plunder Jerusalem and slaughter the Judaeans in 587 or 586 BCE (Psalms 137:7; Obadiah 1:11–14). Some believe that it is for this reason the prophets denounced Edom (Isaiah 34:5–8; Jeremiah 49:7–22; Obadiah passim). Evidence also suggests that at that time Edom may have engaged in a treaty betrayal of Judah. The people of Edom would be dealt with during the Messiah's rulership, according to the prophets. Despite this, many Edomites peacefully migrated to southern Judea, which continued even during the reign of Nabonidus. Regarding the territory of Edom, the book of Jeremiah states that "no one will live there, nor will anyone of mankind reside in it".

Although the Idumaeans controlled the lands to the east and south of the Dead Sea, their peoples were held in contempt by the Israelites. Hence the Book of Psalms says "Moab is my washpot: over Edom will I cast out my shoe". According to the Torah, the congregation could not receive descendants of a marriage between an Israelite and an Edomite until the fourth generation. This law was a subject of controversy between Shimon ben Yohai, who said it applied only to male descendants, and other Tannaim, who said female descendants were also excluded for four generations. From these, some early conversion laws in halacha were derived.

=== Josephus ===
Josephus, when referring to Upper Idumaea, speaks of towns and villages immediately to the south and south-west of Jerusalem, such as Hebron, Halhul, in Greek called Alurus, Bethsura, Begabris Dura (Adorayim), Caphethra, Bethletephon, Teqoa, and Marissa, the latter being a principal city of Idumaea after the influx of Idumaeans into the Hebron Hills, shortly after the demise of the kingdom of Judah and the Judean exile in the 6th-century BC. Strabo describes western Judea as being populated by Idumeans, who commingled with Judeans and adopted their customs.

=== Inscriptions ===
Archaeological records gleaned from Maresha, though largely of Idumaean origin, attest to the region being under the influences of Hellenistic culture, as well as that of Nabatean/Arab, Phoenician, Palmyrene and Jewish culture.

=== New Testament ===
The Gospel of Mark states that the Idumeans joined Judeans, Jerusalemites, Tyrians, Sidonians and east Jordanians in meeting Jesus by the Sea of Galilee.

=== Mishnah ===
The Mishnah refers to Rabbi Ishmael's dwelling place in Kfar Aziz as being "near to Edom".

== Religion ==
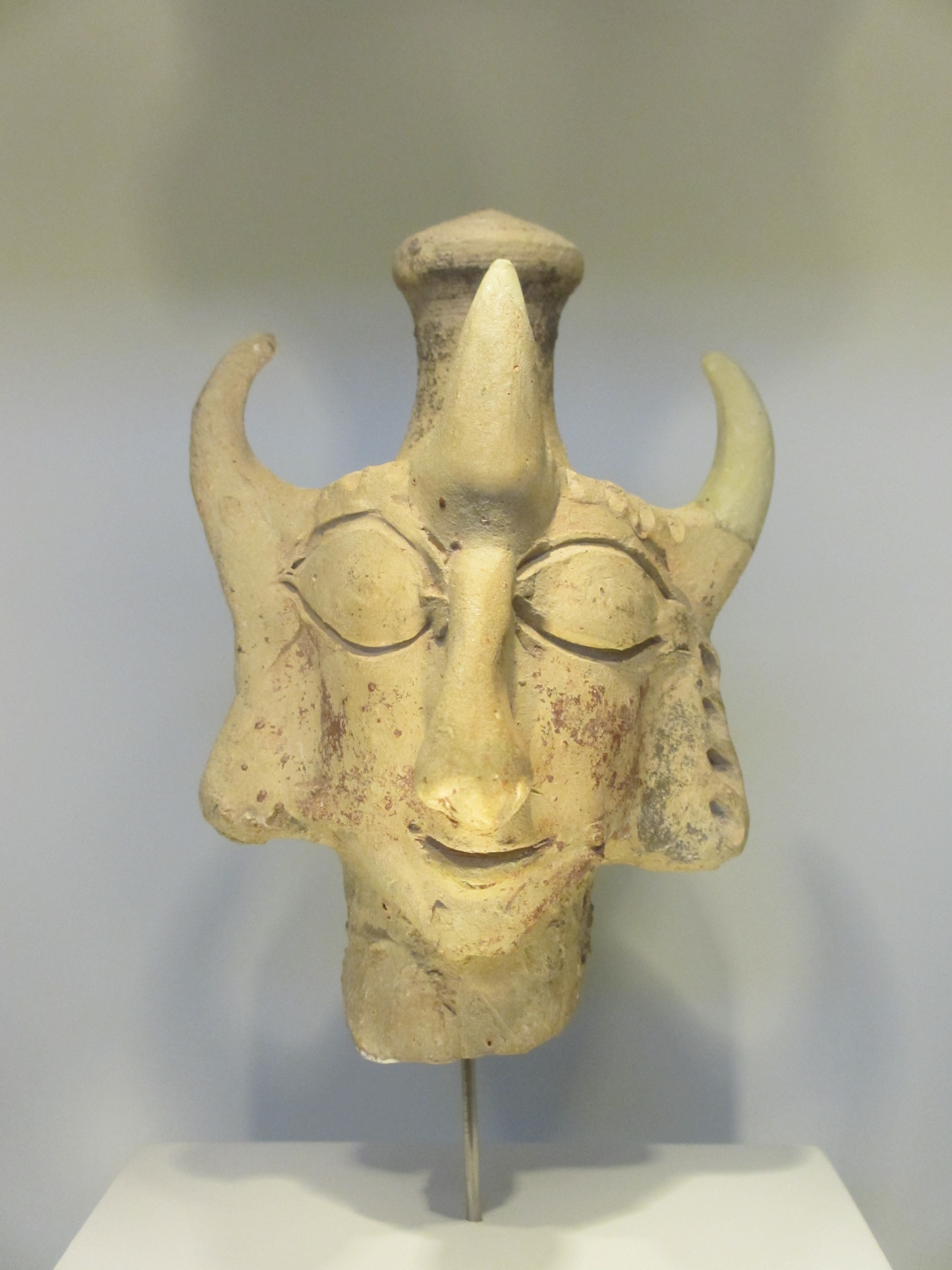
Edomite goddess figure in the Israel Museum

The nature of Edomite religion is largely unknown before their conversion to Judaism by the Hasmoneans. Edomite and Israelites religious practices evolved in parallel and were closely related as part of the larger Semetic religious landscape. At times Edomites seem to have been accepted as part of the Jewish community and followed similar customs, such as circumcision, while at other times they were considered separate.

Epigraphical evidence suggests that the national god of Edom was Qaus (קוס) (also known as 'Qaush', 'Kaush', 'Kaus', 'Kos' or 'Qaws'), since Qaus is invoked in the blessing formula in letters and appear in personal names found in ancient Edom. As close relatives of other Levantine Semites and Arabs, they seem to have worshiped such gods as El, Baal and 'Uzza.

Unlike the gods of other nearby nations, Quaus is never mentioned in the Hebrew bible. Some scholars explain this as Qaus being such similar god to Yahweh, it made rejection of the former difficult. Both gods descend from a common cultural heritage, and may have originated as nationalized versions of the same deity. Qaus's popularity during the Persian and Hellenistic periods may have forced the authors of the Book of Chronicles to portray several Edomite characters as 'pious Levites', to normalize the presence of Edomite worship at the Jerusalem temple. Clues about their Edomite heritage are hidden in their theophoric names.

Josephus states that Costobarus was descended from the priests of "the Koze, whom the Idumeans had formerly served as a god". Victor Sasson describes an Edomite text that parallels the Book of Job, which provides insight on the language, literature, and religion of Edom.

== See also ==
- Edomite language
- ʿApiru
- List of rulers of Edom
- Gerim
