= Proverbs 11 =

Eleventh chapter of the biblical book of Proverbs

- ← chapter 10 chapter 12 →
- The whole Book of Proverbs in the Leningrad Codex (1008 C.E.) from an old facsimile edition.
- Book: Book of Proverbs
- Category: Ketuvim
- Christian Bible part: Old Testament
- Order in the Christian part: 21

Proverbs 11 is the eleventh chapter of the Book of Proverbs in the Hebrew Bible or the Old Testament of the Christian Bible. The book is a compilation of several wisdom literature collections, with the heading in 1:1 may be intended to regard Solomon as the traditional author of the whole book, but the dates of the individual collections are difficult to determine, and the book probably obtained its final shape in the post-exilic period. This chapter is a part of the second collection of the book.

== Text ==
=== Hebrew ===
The following table shows the Hebrew text of Proverbs 11 with vowels alongside an English translation based upon the JPS 1917 translation (now in the public domain).

Verse	Hebrew	English translation (JPS 1917)
1	מֹאזְנֵ֣י מִ֭רְמָה תּוֹעֲבַ֣ת יְהֹוָ֑ה וְאֶ֖בֶן שְׁלֵמָ֣ה רְצוֹנֽוֹ׃	A false balance is an abomination to the LORD; But a perfect weight is His delight.
2	בָּֽא־זָ֭דוֹן וַיָּבֹ֣א קָל֑וֹן וְֽאֶת־צְנוּעִ֥ים חׇכְמָֽה׃	When pride cometh, then cometh shame; But with the lowly is wisdom.
3	תֻּמַּ֣ת יְשָׁרִ֣ים תַּנְחֵ֑ם וְסֶ֖לֶף בֹּגְדִ֣ים (ושדם) [יְשָׁדֵּֽם]׃	The integrity of the upright shall guide them; But the perverseness of the faithless shall destroy them.
4	לֹא־יוֹעִ֣יל ה֭וֹן בְּי֣וֹם עֶבְרָ֑ה וּ֝צְדָקָ֗ה תַּצִּ֥יל מִמָּֽוֶת׃	Riches profit not in the day of wrath; But righteousness delivereth from death.
5	צִדְקַ֣ת תָּ֭מִים תְּיַשֵּׁ֣ר דַּרְכּ֑וֹ וּ֝בְרִשְׁעָת֗וֹ יִפֹּ֥ל רָשָֽׁע׃	The righteousness of the sincere shall make straight his way; But the wicked shall fall by his own wickedness. .
6	צִדְקַ֣ת יְ֭שָׁרִים תַּצִּילֵ֑ם וּ֝בְהַוַּ֗ת בֹּגְדִ֥ים יִלָּכֵֽדוּ׃	The righteousness of the upright shall deliver them; But the faithless shall be trapped in their own crafty device.
7	בְּמ֤וֹת אָדָ֣ם רָ֭שָׁע תֹּאבַ֣ד תִּקְוָ֑ה וְתוֹחֶ֖לֶת אוֹנִ֣ים אָבָֽדָה׃	When a wicked man dieth, his expectation shall perish, And the hope of strength perisheth.
8	צַ֭דִּיק מִצָּרָ֣ה נֶחֱלָ֑ץ וַיָּבֹ֖א רָשָׁ֣ע תַּחְתָּֽיו׃	The righteous is delivered out of trouble, And the wicked cometh in his stead.
9	בְּפֶ֗ה חָ֭נֵף יַשְׁחִ֣ת רֵעֵ֑הוּ וּ֝בְדַ֗עַת צַדִּיקִ֥ים יֵחָלֵֽצוּ׃	With his mouth the impious man destroyeth his neighbour; But through profound knowledge shall the righteous be delivered.
10	בְּט֣וּב צַ֭דִּיקִים תַּעֲלֹ֣ץ קִרְיָ֑ה וּבַאֲבֹ֖ד רְשָׁעִ֣ים רִנָּֽה׃	When it goeth well with the righteous, the city rejoiceth; And when the wicked perish, there is joy.
11	בְּבִרְכַּ֣ת יְ֭שָׁרִים תָּר֣וּם קָ֑רֶת וּבְפִ֥י רְ֝שָׁעִ֗ים תֵּהָרֵֽס׃	By the blessing of the upright a city is exalted; But it is overthrown by the mouth of the wicked.
12	בׇּז־לְרֵעֵ֥הוּ חֲסַר־לֵ֑ב וְאִ֖ישׁ תְּבוּנ֣וֹת יַחֲרִֽישׁ׃	He that despiseth his neighbour lacketh understanding; But a man of discernment holdeth his peace.
13	הוֹלֵ֣ךְ רָ֭כִיל מְגַלֶּה־סּ֑וֹד וְנֶאֱמַן־ר֝֗וּחַ מְכַסֶּ֥ה דָבָֽר׃	He that goeth about as a talebearer revealeth secrets; But he that is of a faithful spirit concealeth a matter.
14	בְּאֵ֣ין תַּ֭חְבֻּלוֹת יִפׇּל־עָ֑ם וּ֝תְשׁוּעָ֗ה בְּרֹ֣ב יוֹעֵֽץ׃	Where no wise direction is, a people falleth; But in the multitude of counsellors there is safety
15	רַע־יֵ֭רוֹעַ כִּי־עָ֣רַב זָ֑ר וְשֹׂנֵ֖א תֹקְעִ֣ים בּוֹטֵֽחַ׃	He that is surety for a stranger shall smart for it; But he that hateth them that strike hands is secure.
16	אֵֽשֶׁת־חֵ֭ן תִּתְמֹ֣ךְ כָּב֑וֹד וְ֝עָרִיצִ֗ים יִתְמְכוּ־עֹֽשֶׁר׃	A gracious woman obtaineth honour; And strong men obtain riches.
17	גֹּמֵ֣ל נַ֭פְשׁוֹ אִ֣ישׁ חָ֑סֶד וְעֹכֵ֥ר שְׁ֝אֵר֗וֹ אַכְזָרִֽי׃	The merciful man doeth good to his own soul; But he that is cruel troubleth his own flesh.
18	רָשָׁ֗ע עֹשֶׂ֥ה פְעֻלַּת־שָׁ֑קֶר וְזֹרֵ֥עַ צְ֝דָקָ֗ה שֶׂ֣כֶר אֱמֶֽת׃	The wicked earneth deceitful wages; But he that soweth righteousness hath a sure reward.
19	כֵּן־צְדָקָ֥ה לְחַיִּ֑ים וּמְרַדֵּ֖ף רָעָ֣ה לְמוֹתֽוֹ׃	Stedfast righteousness tendeth to life; But he that pursueth evil pursueth it to his own death
20	תּוֹעֲבַ֣ת יְ֭הֹוָה עִקְּשֵׁי־לֵ֑ב וּ֝רְצוֹנ֗וֹ תְּמִ֣ימֵי דָֽרֶךְ׃	They that are perverse in heart are an abomination to the LORD; But such as are upright in their way are His delight.
21	יָ֣ד לְ֭יָד לֹא־יִנָּ֣קֶה רָּ֑ע וְזֶ֖רַע צַדִּיקִ֣ים נִמְלָֽט׃	My hand upon it! the evil man shall not be unpunished; But the seed of the righteous shall escape. .
22	נֶ֣זֶם זָ֭הָב בְּאַ֣ף חֲזִ֑יר אִשָּׁ֥ה יָ֝פָ֗ה וְסָ֣רַת טָֽעַם׃	As a ring of gold in a swine's snout, so is a fair woman that turneth aside from discretion.
23	תַּאֲוַ֣ת צַדִּיקִ֣ים אַךְ־ט֑וֹב תִּקְוַ֖ת רְשָׁעִ֣ים עֶבְרָֽה׃	The desire of the righteous is only good; But the expectation of the wicked is wrath.
24	יֵ֣שׁ מְ֭פַזֵּר וְנוֹסָ֥ף ע֑וֹד וְחֹשֵׂ֥ךְ מִ֝יֹּ֗שֶׁר אַךְ־לְמַחְסֽוֹר׃	There is that scattereth, and yet increaseth; And there is that withholdeth more than is meet, but it tendeth only to want.
25	נֶֽפֶשׁ־בְּרָכָ֥ה תְדֻשָּׁ֑ן וּ֝מַרְוֶ֗ה גַּם־ה֥וּא יוֹרֶֽא׃	The beneficent soul shall be made rich, and he that satisfieth abundantly shall be satisfied also himself.
26	מֹ֣נֵֽעַ בָּ֭ר יִקְּבֻ֣הוּ לְא֑וֹם וּ֝בְרָכָ֗ה לְרֹ֣אשׁ מַשְׁבִּֽיר׃	He that withholdeth corn, the people shall curse him; But blessing shall be upon the head of him that selleth it.
27	שֹׁ֣חֵֽר ט֭וֹב יְבַקֵּ֣שׁ רָצ֑וֹן וְדֹרֵ֖שׁ רָעָ֣ה תְבוֹאֶֽנּוּ׃	He that diligently seeketh good seeketh favour; But he that searcheth for evil, it shall come unto him.
28	בּוֹטֵ֣חַ בְּ֭עׇשְׁרוֹ ה֣וּא יִפּ֑וֹל וְ֝כֶעָלֶ֗ה צַדִּיקִ֥ים יִפְרָֽחוּ׃	He that trusteth in his riches shall fall; But the righteous shall flourish as foliage.
29	עֹכֵ֣ר בֵּ֭יתוֹ יִנְחַל־ר֑וּחַ וְעֶ֥בֶד אֱ֝וִ֗יל לַֽחֲכַם־לֵֽב׃	He that troubleth his own house shall inherit the wind; And the foolish shall be servant to the wise of heart.
30	פְּֽרִי־צַ֭דִּיק עֵ֣ץ חַיִּ֑ים וְלֹקֵ֖חַ נְפָשׁ֣וֹת חָכָֽם׃	The fruit of the righteous is a tree of life; And he that is wise winneth souls.
31	הֵ֣ן צַ֭דִּיק בָּאָ֣רֶץ יְשֻׁלָּ֑ם אַ֝֗ף כִּֽי־רָשָׁ֥ע וְחוֹטֵֽא׃	Behold, the righteous shall be requited in the earth; How much more the wicked and the sinner!

=== Textual witnesses ===
Some early manuscripts containing the text of this chapter in Hebrew are of the Masoretic Text, which includes the Aleppo Codex (10th century), and Codex Leningradensis (1008).

There is also a translation into Koine Greek known as the Septuagint, made in the last few centuries BC. Extant ancient manuscripts of the Septuagint version include Codex Vaticanus (B; $\mathfrak{G}$^{B}; 4th century), Codex Sinaiticus (S; BHK: $\mathfrak{G}$^{S}; 4th century), and Codex Alexandrinus (A; $\mathfrak{G}$^{A}; 5th century).

== Analysis ==
This chapter belongs to a section regarded as the second collection in the book of Proverbs (comprising Proverbs 10:1–22:16), also called "The First 'Solomonic' Collection" (the second one in Proverbs 25:1–29:27). The collection contains 375 sayings, each of which consists of two parallel phrases, except for Proverbs 19:7 which consists of three parts.

== Verse 1 ==
A false balance is abomination to the Lord,

but a just weight is His delight.

- "Just weight": from the Hebrew term אבן שלמה, ’e-ḇen šə-lê-māh, "a perfect stone". The word "just" or "perfect" is from the Hebrew word שָׁלֵם, shalem, which can mean "intact, whole, perfect".

Stones were used as a standard for measuring amounts of commodities and precious metals (silver or gold) on the scales, so they were critical to the integrity of economic translations, as some people might cheat by tampering with the scale or the stones. The use of false weights and measures in business practices (cf. Proverbs 16:11; 20:10, 23) is condemned in the Torah (Deuteronomy 25:13–16; Leviticus 19:35–36) and the books of prophets (Amos 8:5; Micah 6:11) as well as in ancient Near-Eastern law codes (ANET 388, 423); the term 'abomination to the LORD' conveys the strongest possible condemnation (cf. Proverbs 6:16).

== Verse 16 ==
A gracious woman gets honor,

and violent men get riches.

- "Violent men": from the Hebrew root עָרִיץ, ʿarits, referring “a person who strikes terror into the hearts of his victims" or " a ruthless person who uses violence to overcome his victims" (BDB 792 s.v.).

The Greek Septuagint version has an addition between the first and second clause as follows:

She who hates virtue makes a throne for dishonor;

the idle will be destitute of means

This is followed by several English versions (e.g., NAB, NEB, NRSV, TEV). The saying contrasts 'the honor that a woman obtains through her natural disposition' with 'the effort men must expend to acquire wealth', with an implication that 'the ruthless men will obtain wealth without honor'.

== See also ==
- Charity
- Creator deity
- Divine providence
- Evil
- Fear of God
- Mitzvah
- Nephesh
- Omniscience
- Relativism
- Righteousness
- Sin
- Soul in the Bible
- YHWH
- Related Bible parts: Psalm 30, Psalm 49, Proverbs 9, Proverbs 20, Proverbs 23

== Sources ==
- Aitken, K. T. (2007). "19. Proverbs". In Barton, John; Muddiman, John (eds.). The Oxford Bible Commentary (first (paperback) ed.). Oxford University Press. pp. 405–422. ISBN 978-0199277186.
- Alter, Robert (2010). The Wisdom Books: Job, Proverbs, and Ecclesiastes: A Translation with Commentary. W.W. Norton & Co. ISBN 978-0393080735.
- Coogan, Michael David (2007). Coogan, Michael David; Brettler, Marc Zvi; Newsom, Carol Ann; Perkins, Pheme (eds.). The New Oxford Annotated Bible with the Apocryphal/Deuterocanonical Books: New Revised Standard Version, Issue 48 (Augmented 3rd ed.). Oxford University Press. ISBN 9780195288810.
- Farmer, Kathleen A. (1998). "The Wisdom Books". In McKenzie, Steven L.; Graham, Matt Patrick (eds.). The Hebrew Bible Today: An Introduction to Critical Issues. Westminster John Knox Press. ISBN 978-0-66425652-4.
- Fox, Michael V. (2009). Proverbs 10-31: A New Translation with Introduction and Commentary. Anchor Yale Bible Commentaries. Yale University Press. ISBN 978-0300155563.
- Halley, Henry H. (1965). Halley's Bible Handbook: an abbreviated Bible commentary (24th (revised) ed.). Zondervan Publishing House. ISBN 0-310-25720-4.
- Perdue, Leo G. (2012). Proverbs Interpretation: A Bible Commentary for Teaching and Preaching. Presbyterian Publishing Corporation. ISBN 978-0664238841.
- Würthwein, Ernst (1995). The Text of the Old Testament. Translated by Rhodes, Erroll F. Grand Rapids, MI: Wm. B. Eerdmans. ISBN 0-8028-0788-7.
