= Proverbs 20 =

Twentieth chapter of the biblical book of Proverbs

- ← chapter 19 chapter 21 →
- The whole Book of Proverbs in the Leningrad Codex (1008 C.E.) from an old facsimile edition.
- Book: Book of Proverbs
- Category: Ketuvim
- Christian Bible part: Old Testament
- Order in the Christian part: 21

Proverbs 20 is the twentieth chapter of the Book of Proverbs in the Hebrew Bible or the Old Testament of the Christian Bible. The book is a compilation of several wisdom literature collections; the heading in Proverbs 1:1 may be intended to portray Solomon as the traditional author of the whole book, but the dates of the individual collections are difficult to determine, and the book probably obtained its final shape in the post-exilic period.

This chapter is a part of the second collection of the book.

== Text ==
=== Hebrew ===
The following table shows the Hebrew text of Proverbs 20 with vowels alongside an English translation based upon the JPS 1917 translation (now in the public domain).

Verse	Hebrew	English translation (JPS 1917)
1	לֵ֣ץ הַ֭יַּיִן הֹמֶ֣ה שֵׁכָ֑ר וְכׇל־שֹׁ֥גֶה בּ֝֗וֹ לֹ֣א יֶחְכָּֽם׃	Wine is a mocker, strong drink is riotous; and whosoever reeleth thereby is not wise.
2	נַ֣הַם כַּ֭כְּפִיר אֵ֣ימַת מֶ֑לֶךְ מִ֝תְעַבְּר֗וֹ חוֹטֵ֥א נַפְשֽׁוֹ׃	The terror of a king is as the roaring of a lion: He that provoketh him to anger forfeiteth his life.
3	כָּב֣וֹד לָ֭אִישׁ שֶׁ֣בֶת מֵרִ֑יב וְכׇל־אֱ֝וִ֗יל יִתְגַּלָּֽע׃	It is an honour for a man to keep aloof from strife; but every fool will be snarling.
4	מֵ֭חֹרֶף עָצֵ֣ל לֹא־יַחֲרֹ֑שׁ (ישאל) [וְשָׁאַ֖ל] בַּקָּצִ֣יר וָאָֽיִן׃	The sluggard will not plow when winter setteth in; therefore he shall beg in harvest, and have nothing.
5	מַ֣יִם עֲ֭מֻקִּים עֵצָ֣ה בְלֶב־אִ֑ישׁ וְאִ֖ישׁ תְּבוּנָ֣ה יִדְלֶֽנָּה׃	Counsel in the heart of man is like deep water; but a man of understanding will draw it out.
6	רׇב־אָדָ֗ם יִ֭קְרָא אִ֣ישׁ חַסְדּ֑וֹ וְאִ֥ישׁ אֱ֝מוּנִ֗ים מִ֣י יִמְצָֽא׃	Most men will proclaim every one his own goodness; but a faithful man who can find?
7	מִתְהַלֵּ֣ךְ בְּתֻמּ֣וֹ צַדִּ֑יק אַשְׁרֵ֖י בָנָ֣יו אַחֲרָֽיו׃	He that walketh in his integrity as a just man, happy are his children after him.
8	מֶ֗לֶךְ יוֹשֵׁ֥ב עַל־כִּסֵּא־דִ֑ין מְזָרֶ֖ה בְעֵינָ֣יו כׇּל־רָֽע׃	A king that sitteth on the throne of judgment scattereth away all evil with his eyes.
9	מִֽי־יֹ֭אמַר זִכִּ֣יתִי לִבִּ֑י טָ֝הַ֗רְתִּי מֵחַטָּאתִֽי׃	Who can say: ‘I have made my heart clean, I am pure from my sin’?
10	אֶ֣בֶן וָ֭אֶבֶן אֵיפָ֣ה וְאֵיפָ֑ה תּוֹעֲבַ֥ת יְ֝הֹוָ֗ה גַּם־שְׁנֵיהֶֽם׃	Divers weights, and divers measures, both of them alike are abomination to the LORD.
11	גַּ֣ם בְּ֭מַעֲלָלָיו יִתְנַכֶּר־נָ֑עַר אִם־זַ֖ךְ וְאִם־יָשָׁ֣ר פׇּעֳלֽוֹ׃	Even a child is known by his doings, whether his work be pure, and whether it be right.
12	אֹ֣זֶן שֹׁ֭מַעַת וְעַ֣יִן רֹאָ֑ה יְ֝הֹוָ֗ה עָשָׂ֥ה גַם־שְׁנֵיהֶֽם׃	The hearing ear, and the seeing eye, the LORD hath made even both of them.
13	אַל־תֶּאֱהַ֣ב שֵׁ֭נָה פֶּן־תִּוָּרֵ֑שׁ פְּקַ֖ח עֵינֶ֣יךָ שְֽׂבַֽע־לָֽחֶם׃	Love not sleep, lest thou come to poverty; open thine eyes, and thou shalt have bread in plenty.
14	רַ֣ע רַ֭ע יֹאמַ֣ר הַקּוֹנֶ֑ה וְאֹזֵ֥ל ל֝֗וֹ אָ֣ז יִתְהַלָּֽל׃	’It is bad, it is bad’, saith the buyer; but when he is gone his way, then he boasteth.
15	יֵ֣שׁ זָ֭הָב וְרׇב־פְּנִינִ֑ים וּכְלִ֥י יְ֝קָ֗ר שִׂפְתֵי־דָֽעַת׃	There is gold, and a multitude of rubies; but the lips of knowledge are a precious jewel.
16	לְֽקַח־בִּ֭גְדוֹ כִּי־עָ֣רַב זָ֑ר וּבְעַ֖ד (נכרים) [נׇכְרִיָּ֣ה] חַבְלֵֽהוּ׃	Take his garment that is surety for a stranger; and hold him in pledge that is surety for an alien woman.
17	עָרֵ֣ב לָ֭אִישׁ לֶ֣חֶם שָׁ֑קֶר וְ֝אַחַ֗ר יִמָּֽלֵא־פִ֥יהוּ חָצָֽץ׃	Bread of falsehood is sweet to a man; but afterwards his mouth shall be filled with gravel
18	מַ֭חֲשָׁבוֹת בְּעֵצָ֣ה תִכּ֑וֹן וּ֝בְתַחְבֻּל֗וֹת עֲשֵׂ֣ה מִלְחָמָֽה׃	Every purpose is established by counsel; and with good advice carry on war.
19	גּֽוֹלֶה־סּ֭וֹד הוֹלֵ֣ךְ רָכִ֑יל וּלְפֹתֶ֥ה שְׂ֝פָתָ֗יו לֹ֣א תִתְעָרָֽב׃	He that goeth about as a talebearer revealeth secrets; therefore meddle not with him that openeth wide his lips.
20	מְ֭קַלֵּל אָבִ֣יו וְאִמּ֑וֹ יִֽדְעַ֥ךְ נֵ֝ר֗וֹ (באישון) [בֶּאֱשׁ֥וּן] חֹֽשֶׁךְ׃	Whoso curseth his father or his mother, his lamp shall be put out in the blackest darkness.
21	נַ֭חֲלָה (מבחלת) [מְבֹהֶ֣לֶת] בָּרִאשׁוֹנָ֑ה וְ֝אַחֲרִיתָ֗הּ לֹ֣א תְבֹרָֽךְ׃	An estate may be gotten hastily at the beginning; but the end thereof shall not be blessed.
22	אַל־תֹּאמַ֥ר אֲשַׁלְּמָה־רָ֑ע קַוֵּ֥ה לַ֝יהֹוָ֗ה וְיֹ֣שַֽׁע לָֽךְ׃	Say not thou: ‘I will requite evil’; wait for the LORD, and He will save thee.
23	תּוֹעֲבַ֣ת יְ֭הֹוָה אֶ֣בֶן וָאָ֑בֶן וּמֹאזְנֵ֖י מִרְמָ֣ה לֹא־טֽוֹב׃	Divers weights are an abomination to the LORD; and a false balance is not good.
24	מֵיְהֹוָ֥ה מִצְעֲדֵי־גָ֑בֶר וְ֝אָדָ֗ם מַה־יָּבִ֥ין דַּרְכּֽוֹ׃	A man's goings are of the LORD; how then can man look to his way?
25	מוֹקֵ֣שׁ אָ֭דָם יָ֣לַע קֹ֑דֶשׁ וְאַחַ֖ר נְדָרִ֣ים לְבַקֵּֽר׃	It is a snare to a man rashly to say: ‘Holy’, and after vows to make inquiry.
26	מְזָרֶ֣ה רְ֭שָׁעִים מֶ֣לֶךְ חָכָ֑ם וַיָּ֖שֶׁב עֲלֵיהֶ֣ם אוֹפָֽן׃	A wise king sifteth the wicked, and turneth the wheel over them.
27	נֵ֣ר יְ֭הֹוָה נִשְׁמַ֣ת אָדָ֑ם חֹ֝פֵ֗שׂ כׇּל־חַדְרֵי־בָֽטֶן׃	The spirit of man is the lamp of the LORD, searching all the inward parts.
28	חֶ֣סֶד וֶֽ֭אֱמֶת יִצְּרוּ־מֶ֑לֶךְ וְסָעַ֖ד בַּחֶ֣סֶד כִּסְאֽוֹ׃	Mercy and truth preserve the king; and his throne is upheld by mercy.
29	תִּפְאֶ֣רֶת בַּחוּרִ֣ים כֹּחָ֑ם וַהֲדַ֖ר זְקֵנִ֣ים שֵׂיבָֽה׃	The glory of young men is their strength; and the beauty of old men is the hoary head.
30	חַבֻּר֣וֹת פֶּ֭צַע (תמריק) [תַּמְר֣וּק] בְּרָ֑ע וּ֝מַכּ֗וֹת חַדְרֵי־בָֽטֶן׃	Sharp wounds cleanse away evil; So do stripes that reach the inward parts.

=== Textual witnesses ===
Some early manuscripts containing the text of this chapter in Hebrew are of the Masoretic Text, which includes the Aleppo Codex (10th century), and Codex Leningradensis (1008).

There is also a translation into Koine Greek known as the Septuagint, made in the last few centuries BC. Extant ancient manuscripts of the Septuagint version include Codex Vaticanus (B; $\mathfrak{G}$^{B}; 4th century), Codex Sinaiticus (S; BHK: $\mathfrak{G}$^{S}; 4th century), and Codex Alexandrinus (A; $\mathfrak{G}$^{A}; 5th century).

== Parashot ==
The parashah sections listed here are based on the Aleppo Codex. {P}: open parashah.

{P} 19:10–29; 20:1–30; 21:1–30 {P} 21:31; 22:1–29 {P}

== Analysis ==
This chapter belongs to a section regarded as the second collection in the book of Proverbs (comprising Proverbs 10:1–22:16), also called "The First 'Solomonic' Collection" (the second one in Proverbs 25:1–29:27). The collection contains 375 sayings, each of which consists of two parallel phrases, except for Proverbs 19:7 which consists of three parts.

=== Verse 1 ===
Wine is a mocker, strong drink is raging:

and whosoever is deceived thereby is not wise.

- "Wine": based on the locality likely refers to grape wine and barley beer (cf. Leviticus 10:9; Deuteronomy 14:26; Isaiah 28:7).
- "Raging": can also be rendered as "brawler" (cf. Proverbs 23:29-35). The two participles לֵץ (lets, "mocker") and הֹמֶה (homeh, "brawler") are substantives, functioning as predicates in the sentence.

The last phrase may mean that "drinking to excess is not wise" or that "drinking to excess makes a person act unwisely", so the proverb does not prohibit the use of wine or beer, as strong drink was typically used at festivals and celebrations, but in the covenant community intoxication was considered out of bounds (cf. Proverbs 23:20–21, 29–35; 31:4–7).

=== Verse 14 ===
"It is bad, it is bad," says the buyer;

but when he has gone his way, then he boasts.

"It is bad, it is bad" comes from the Hebrew words רַ֣ע רַ֭ע, ra‘ ra‘, "evil, evil", "it is naught, it is naught" (KJV) or "it is good for nothing" (NKJV) This verse portrays a negotiation procedure in the business world. When bargaining, a buyer would complain that he is being offered "inferior goods", so he could obtain a reduction in the price; thereafter he would brag about what a good deal he obtained. Abraham's willingness to pay Ephron "four hundred shekels of silver" for the cave where he intended to bury Sarah, without further discussion, has been contrasted with the business practice displayed in this verse.

=== Verse 25 ===
It is a snare to the man who dedicates rashly that which is holy,

and after the vows to make inquiry.

- "Snare": because it could lead into financial difficulties (cf. Leviticus 27 talking about foolish or rash vows).
- "Dedicates rashly": from the Hebrew verb לוּע (luʿ) or לָעַע (laʿaʿ), meaning "to talk wildly". This word is only found here and in Job 6:3.

This verse is about the folly of rash speaking (cf. Proverbs 29:20) especially in relation to a vow, because failure to fulfil a vow was a serious matter (cf. Numbers 30:2; Deuteronomy 23:21–23), whereas fulfilling a rash vow could be costly (cf. Jephthah and his daughter in Judges 11:29–40).

== See also ==
- Alcohol in the Bible
- Creator deity
- Divine providence
- Evil
- Nephesh
- Omniscience
- Sin
- Soul in the Bible
- YHWH
- Related Bible parts: Psalm 21, Proverbs 9, Proverbs 18, Proverbs 22, Proverbs 23

== Sources ==
- Aitken, K. T. (2007). "19. Proverbs". In Barton, John; Muddiman, John (eds.). The Oxford Bible Commentary (first (paperback) ed.). Oxford University Press. pp. 405–422. ISBN 978-0199277186.
- Alter, Robert (2010). The Wisdom Books: Job, Proverbs, and Ecclesiastes: A Translation with Commentary. W.W. Norton & Co. ISBN 978-0393080735.
- Coogan, Michael David (2007). Coogan, Michael David; Brettler, Marc Zvi; Newsom, Carol Ann; Perkins, Pheme (eds.). The New Oxford Annotated Bible with the Apocryphal/Deuterocanonical Books: New Revised Standard Version, Issue 48 (Augmented 3rd ed.). Oxford University Press. ISBN 9780195288810.
- Farmer, Kathleen A. (1998). "The Wisdom Books". In McKenzie, Steven L.; Graham, Matt Patrick (eds.). The Hebrew Bible Today: An Introduction to Critical Issues. Westminster John Knox Press. ISBN 978-0-66425652-4.
- Fox, Michael V. (2009). Proverbs 10-31: A New Translation with Introduction and Commentary. Anchor Yale Bible Commentaries. Yale University Press. ISBN 978-0300155563.
- Halley, Henry H. (1965). Halley's Bible Handbook: an abbreviated Bible commentary (24th (revised) ed.). Zondervan Publishing House. ISBN 0-310-25720-4.
- Perdue, Leo G. (2012). Proverbs Interpretation: A Bible Commentary for Teaching and Preaching. Presbyterian Publishing Corporation. ISBN 978-0664238841.
- Würthwein, Ernst (1995). The Text of the Old Testament. Translated by Rhodes, Erroll F. Grand Rapids, MI: Wm. B. Eerdmans. ISBN 0-8028-0788-7.
