= Proverbs 21 =

Twenty-first chapter of the biblical book of Proverbs

- ← chapter 20 chapter 22 →
- The whole Book of Proverbs in the Leningrad Codex (1008 C.E.) from an old facsimile edition.
- Book: Book of Proverbs
- Category: Ketuvim
- Christian Bible part: Old Testament
- Order in the Christian part: 21

Proverbs 21 is the 21st chapter of the Book of Proverbs in the Hebrew Bible or the Old Testament of the Christian Bible. The book is a compilation of several wisdom literature collections: the heading in Proverbs 1:1 may be intended to portray Solomon as the traditional author of the whole book, but the dates of the individual collections are difficult to determine, and the book probably obtained its final shape in the post-exilic period. This chapter records a part of the second collection of the book.

== Text ==
=== Hebrew ===
The following table shows the Hebrew text of Proverbs 21 with vowels alongside an English translation based upon the JPS 1917 translation (now in the public domain).

Verse	Hebrew	English translation (JPS 1917)
1	פַּלְגֵי־מַ֣יִם לֶב־מֶ֭לֶךְ בְּיַד־יְהֹוָ֑ה עַֽל־כׇּל־אֲשֶׁ֖ר יַחְפֹּ֣ץ יַטֶּֽנּוּ׃	The king's heart is in the hand of the LORD, as the watercourses: He turneth it whithersoever He will.
2	כׇּֽל־דֶּרֶךְ־אִ֭ישׁ יָשָׁ֣ר בְּעֵינָ֑יו וְתֹכֵ֖ן לִבּ֣וֹת יְהֹוָֽה׃	Every way of a man is right in his own eyes; But the LORD weigheth the hearts.
3	עֲ֭שֹׂה צְדָקָ֣ה וּמִשְׁפָּ֑ט נִבְחָ֖ר לַיהֹוָ֣ה מִזָּֽבַח׃	To do righteousness and justice Is more acceptable to the LORD than sacrifice.
4	רוּם־עֵ֭ינַיִם וּרְחַב־לֵ֑ב נִ֖ר רְשָׁעִ֣ים חַטָּֽאת׃	A haughty look, and a proud heart— The tillage of the wicked is sin.
5	מַחְשְׁב֣וֹת חָ֭רוּץ אַךְ־לְמוֹתָ֑ר וְכׇל־אָ֝֗ץ אַךְ־לְמַחְסֽוֹר׃	The thoughts of the diligent tend only to plenteousness; But every one that is hasty hasteth only to want.
6	פֹּ֣עַל אֹ֭צָרוֹת בִּלְשׁ֣וֹן שָׁ֑קֶר הֶ֥בֶל נִ֝דָּ֗ף מְבַקְשֵׁי־מָֽוֶת׃	The getting of treasures by a lying tongue Is a vapour driven to and fro; they [that seek them] seek death.
7	שֹׁד־רְשָׁעִ֥ים יְגוֹרֵ֑ם כִּ֥י מֵ֝אֲנ֗וּ לַעֲשׂ֥וֹת מִשְׁפָּֽט׃	The violence of the wicked shall drag them away; Because they refuse to do justly.
8	הֲפַכְפַּ֬ךְ דֶּ֣רֶךְ אִ֣ישׁ וָזָ֑ר וְ֝זַ֗ךְ יָשָׁ֥ר פׇּעֳלֽוֹ׃	The way of man is froward and strange; But as for the pure, his work is right.
9	ט֗וֹב לָשֶׁ֥בֶת עַל־פִּנַּת־גָּ֑ג מֵאֵ֥שֶׁת מִ֝דְיָנִ֗ים וּבֵ֥ית חָֽבֶר׃	It is better to dwell in a corner of the housetop, Than in a house in common with a contentious woman.
10	נֶ֣פֶשׁ רָ֭שָׁע אִוְּתָה־רָ֑ע לֹֽא־יֻחַ֖ן בְּעֵינָ֣יו רֵעֵֽהוּ׃	The soul of the wicked desireth evil; His neighbour findeth no favour in his eyes.
11	בַּֽעֲנׇשׁ־לֵ֭ץ יֶחְכַּם־פֶּ֑תִי וּבְהַשְׂכִּ֥יל לְ֝חָכָ֗ם יִקַּח־דָּֽעַת׃	When the scorner is punished, the thoughtless is made wise; And when the wise is instructed, he receiveth knowledge.
12	מַשְׂכִּ֣יל צַ֭דִּיק לְבֵ֣ית רָשָׁ֑ע מְסַלֵּ֖ף רְשָׁעִ֣ים לָרָֽע׃	The Righteous One considereth the house of the wicked; Overthrowing the wicked to their ruin.
13	אֹטֵ֣ם אׇ֭זְנוֹ מִזַּעֲקַת־דָּ֑ל גַּֽם־ה֥וּא יִ֝קְרָ֗א וְלֹ֣א יֵעָנֶֽה׃	Whoso stoppeth his ears at the cry of the poor, He also shall cry himself, but shall not be answered.
14	מַתָּ֣ן בַּ֭סֵּתֶר יִכְפֶּה־אָ֑ף וְשֹׁ֥חַד בַּ֝חֵ֗ק חֵמָ֥ה עַזָּֽה׃	A gift in secret pacifieth anger, And a present in the bosom strong wrath.
15	שִׂמְחָ֣ה לַ֭צַּדִּיק עֲשׂ֣וֹת מִשְׁפָּ֑ט וּ֝מְחִתָּ֗ה לְפֹ֣עֲלֵי אָֽוֶן׃	To do justly is joy to the righteous, But ruin to the workers of iniquity.
16	אָדָ֗ם תּ֭וֹעֶה מִדֶּ֣רֶךְ הַשְׂכֵּ֑ל בִּקְהַ֖ל רְפָאִ֣ים יָנֽוּחַ׃	The man that strayeth out of the way of understanding Shall rest in the congregation of the shades.
17	אִ֣ישׁ מַ֭חְסוֹר אֹהֵ֣ב שִׂמְחָ֑ה אֹהֵ֥ב יַֽיִן־וָ֝שֶׁ֗מֶן לֹ֣א יַעֲשִֽׁיר׃	He that loveth pleasure shall be a poor man; He that loveth wine and oil shall not be rich.
18	כֹּ֣פֶר לַצַּדִּ֣יק רָשָׁ֑ע וְתַ֖חַת יְשָׁרִ֣ים בּוֹגֵֽד׃	The wicked is a ransom for the righteous; And the faithless cometh in the stead of the upright.
19	ט֗וֹב שֶׁ֥בֶת בְּאֶֽרֶץ־מִדְבָּ֑ר מֵאֵ֖שֶׁת (מדונים) [מִדְיָנִ֣ים] וָכָֽעַס׃	It is better to dwell in a desert land, Than with a contentious and fretful woman.
20	אוֹצָ֤ר ׀ נֶחְמָ֣ד וָ֭שֶׁמֶן בִּנְוֵ֣ה חָכָ֑ם וּכְסִ֖יל אָדָ֣ם יְבַלְּעֶֽנּוּ׃	There is desirable treasure and oil in the dwelling of the wise; But a foolish man swalloweth it up.
21	רֹ֭דֵף צְדָקָ֣ה וָחָ֑סֶד יִמְצָ֥א חַ֝יִּ֗ים צְדָקָ֥ה וְכָבֽוֹד׃	He that followeth after righteousness and mercy Findeth life, prosperity, and honour.
22	עִ֣יר גִּ֭בֹּרִים עָלָ֣ה חָכָ֑ם וַ֝יֹּ֗רֶד עֹ֣ז מִבְטֶחָֽהֿ׃	A wise man scaleth the city of the mighty, And bringeth down the stronghold wherein it trusteth.
23	שֹׁמֵ֣ר פִּ֭יו וּלְשׁוֹנ֑וֹ שֹׁמֵ֖ר מִצָּר֣וֹת נַפְשֽׁוֹ׃	Whoso keepeth his mouth and his tongue Keepeth his soul from troubles.
24	זֵ֣ד יָ֭הִיר לֵ֣ץ שְׁמ֑וֹ ע֝וֹשֶׂ֗ה בְּעֶבְרַ֥ת זָדֽוֹן׃	A proud and haughty man, scorner is his name, Even he that dealeth in overbearing pride.
25	תַּאֲוַ֣ת עָצֵ֣ל תְּמִיתֶ֑נּוּ כִּֽי־מֵאֲנ֖וּ יָדָ֣יו לַעֲשֽׂוֹת׃	The desire of the slothful killeth him; For his hands refuse to labour.
26	כׇּל־הַ֭יּוֹם הִתְאַוָּ֣ה תַאֲוָ֑ה וְצַדִּ֥יק יִ֝תֵּ֗ן וְלֹ֣א יַחְשֹֽׂךְ׃	There is that coveteth greedily all the day long; But the righteous giveth and spareth not.
27	זֶ֣בַח רְ֭שָׁעִים תּוֹעֵבָ֑ה אַ֝֗ף כִּֽי־בְזִמָּ֥ה יְבִיאֶֽנּוּ׃	The sacrifice of the wicked is an abomination; How much more, when he bringeth it with the proceeds of wickedness?
28	עֵד־כְּזָבִ֥ים יֹאבֵ֑ד וְאִ֥ישׁ שׁ֝וֹמֵ֗עַ לָנֶ֥צַח יְדַבֵּֽר׃	A false witness shall perish; But the man that obeyeth shall speak unchallenged.
29	הֵעֵ֬ז אִ֣ישׁ רָשָׁ֣ע בְּפָנָ֑יו וְ֝יָשָׁ֗ר ה֤וּא ׀ (יכין דרכיו) [יָבִ֬ין דַּרְכּֽוֹ]׃	A wicked man hardeneth his face; But as for the upright, he looketh well to his way.
30	אֵ֣ין חׇ֭כְמָה וְאֵ֣ין תְּבוּנָ֑ה וְאֵ֥ין עֵ֝צָ֗ה לְנֶ֣גֶד יְהֹוָֽה׃	There is no wisdom nor understanding Nor counsel against the LORD.
31	ס֗וּס מ֭וּכָן לְי֣וֹם מִלְחָמָ֑ה וְ֝לַיהֹוָ֗ה הַתְּשׁוּעָֽה׃	The horse is prepared against the day of battle; But victory is of the LORD.

=== Textual witnesses ===
Some early manuscripts containing the text of this chapter in Hebrew are of the Masoretic Text, which includes the Aleppo Codex (10th century), and Codex Leningradensis (1008).

There is also a translation into Koine Greek known as the Septuagint, made in the last few centuries BC. Extant ancient manuscripts of the Septuagint version include Codex Vaticanus (B; $\mathfrak{G}$^{B}; 4th century), Codex Sinaiticus (S; BHK: $\mathfrak{G}$^{S}; 4th century), and Codex Alexandrinus (A; $\mathfrak{G}$^{A}; 5th century).

== Parashot ==
The parashah sections listed here are based on the Aleppo Codex. {P}: open parashah.

{P} 19:10–29; 20:1–30; 21:1–30 {P} 21:31; 22:1–29 {P}

== Analysis ==
This chapter belongs to a section regarded as the second collection in the book of Proverbs (comprising Proverbs 10:1–22:16), also called "The First 'Solomonic' Collection" (the second one in Proverbs 25:1–29:27). The collection contains 375 sayings, each of which consists of two parallel phrases, except for Proverbs 19:7 which consists of three parts.

== Verse 1 ==
The king's heart is in the hand of the Lord,

as the rivers of water; He turns it to any place He will.

- "Rivers" can be rendered as "channels", or as "streams", like "irrigation channels", which can be directed to where they are needed, so any best-laid human plans and intentions that do not conform to God's purposes will not succeed (verse 30; cf. Psalm 33:10-11).

God has sovereign control of human affairs (cf. verses 30–31), including over the actions and decisions of a king, who may work willingly (Psalm 78:70), or unwittingly (cf. Jeremiah 25:9), to achieve divine purposes (cf. 16:1, 9).

== Verse 3 ==
To do justice and judgment is more acceptable to the Lord than sacrifice.

- "More acceptable" is from the Hebrew root verb בָּחַר, bakhar, "to choose", as Niphal participle can be rendered as "choice to the Lord" or "chosen of the Lord", meaning "acceptable to the Lord" (cf. TEV: "pleases the Lord more").

God's priority of righteousness and justice over religious worship rituals or 'sacrifices' is a common prophetic theme (cf. Proverbs 15:8; 21:29; 1 Samuel 15:22; Psalm 40:6–8; Isaiah 1:11–17; Jeremiah 7:21–26; Hosea 6:6; Amos 5:21–27; Micah 6:6–8), and is illustrated by Saul' action (1 Samuel 15). Worse than this is the 'evil intent' accompanying the offensiveness of the sacrifices by the wicked (verse 27).

== Verse 31 ==
The horse is prepared against the day of battle: but safety is of the Lord.

- "Of the Lord”: that is, "accomplished by God", not from human efforts or preparation. This is the basis of prayers on the eve of battle (cf Psalm 20:7; 33:17).

== See also ==
- Diligence
- Divine providence
- Enemy
- Envy
- Evil
- Foolishness
- Fraud
- Humility
- Judgement
- Justice
- Knowledge
- Laziness
- Lie
- Mercy
- Nephesh
- Omniscience
- Parenting
- Poverty
- Pride
- Prudence
- Relativism
- Reputation
- Righteousness
- Robbery
- Sin
- Soul in the Bible
- Truth
- Understanding
- Wealth
- Wickedness
- Wisdom
- YHWH
- Related Bible parts: Psalm 21, Proverbs 9, Proverbs 18, Proverbs 22, Proverbs 25

== Sources ==
- Aitken, K. T. (2007). "19. Proverbs". In Barton, John; Muddiman, John (eds.). The Oxford Bible Commentary (first (paperback) ed.). Oxford University Press. pp. 405–422. ISBN 978-0199277186.
- Alter, Robert (2010). The Wisdom Books: Job, Proverbs, and Ecclesiastes: A Translation with Commentary. W.W. Norton & Co. ISBN 978-0393080735.
- Coogan, Michael David (2007). Coogan, Michael David; Brettler, Marc Zvi; Newsom, Carol Ann; Perkins, Pheme (eds.). The New Oxford Annotated Bible with the Apocryphal/Deuterocanonical Books: New Revised Standard Version, Issue 48 (Augmented 3rd ed.). Oxford University Press. ISBN 9780195288810.
- Farmer, Kathleen A. (1998). "The Wisdom Books". In McKenzie, Steven L.; Graham, Matt Patrick (eds.). The Hebrew Bible Today: An Introduction to Critical Issues. Westminster John Knox Press. ISBN 978-0-66425652-4.
- Fox, Michael V. (2009). Proverbs 10-31: A New Translation with Introduction and Commentary. Anchor Yale Bible Commentaries. Yale University Press. ISBN 978-0300155563.
- Halley, Henry H. (1965). Halley's Bible Handbook: an abbreviated Bible commentary (24th (revised) ed.). Zondervan Publishing House. ISBN 0-310-25720-4.
- Perdue, Leo G. (2012). Proverbs Interpretation: A Bible Commentary for Teaching and Preaching. Presbyterian Publishing Corporation. ISBN 978-0664238841.
- Würthwein, Ernst (1995). The Text of the Old Testament. Translated by Rhodes, Erroll F. Grand Rapids, MI: Wm. B. Eerdmans. ISBN 0-8028-0788-7.
