= Proverbs 17 =

Seventeenth chapter of the biblical book of Proverbs

- ← chapter 16 chapter 18 →
- The whole Book of Proverbs in the Leningrad Codex (1008 C.E.) from an old facsimile edition.
- Book: Book of Proverbs
- Category: Ketuvim
- Christian Bible part: Old Testament
- Order in the Christian part: 21

Proverbs 17 is the seventeenth chapter of the Book of Proverbs in the Hebrew Bible and of the Old Testament in the Christian Bible. The book is a compilation of several wisdom literature collections, with the heading in 1:1 may be intended to regard Solomon as the traditional author of the whole book, but the dates of the individual collections are difficult to determine, and the book probably obtained its final shape in the post-exilic period. This chapter is a part of the second collection of the book.

== Text ==
=== Hebrew ===
The following table shows the Hebrew text of Proverbs 17 with vowels alongside an English translation based upon the JPS 1917 translation (now in the public domain).

Verse	Hebrew	English translation (JPS 1917)
1	ט֤וֹב פַּ֣ת חֲ֭רֵבָה וְשַׁלְוָה־בָ֑הּ מִ֝בַּ֗יִת מָלֵ֥א זִבְחֵי־רִֽיב׃	Better is a dry morsel and quietness therewith, Than a house full of feasting with strife.
2	עֶֽבֶד־מַשְׂכִּ֗יל יִ֭מְשֹׁל בְּבֵ֣ן מֵבִ֑ישׁ וּבְת֥וֹךְ אַ֝חִ֗ים יַחֲלֹ֥ק נַחֲלָֽה׃	A servant that dealeth wisely shall have rule over a son that dealeth shamefully, And shall have part of the inheritance among the brethren.
3	מַצְרֵ֣ף לַ֭כֶּסֶף וְכ֣וּר לַזָּהָ֑ב וּבֹחֵ֖ן לִבּ֣וֹת יְהֹוָֽה׃	The refining pot is for silver, and the furnace for gold; But the LORD trieth the hearts. .
4	מֵ֭רַע מַקְשִׁ֣יב עַל־שְׂפַת־אָ֑וֶן שֶׁ֥קֶר מֵ֝זִ֗ין עַל־לְשׁ֥וֹן הַוֺּֽת׃	A evil-doer giveth heed to wicked lips; And a liar giveth ear to a mischievous tongue.
5	לֹעֵ֣ג לָ֭רָשׁ חֵרֵ֣ף עֹשֵׂ֑הוּ שָׂמֵ֥חַ לְ֝אֵ֗יד לֹ֣א יִנָּקֶֽה׃	Whoso mocketh the poor blasphemeth his Maker; And he that is glad at calamity shall not be unpunished.
6	עֲטֶ֣רֶת זְ֭קֵנִים בְּנֵ֣י בָנִ֑ים וְתִפְאֶ֖רֶת בָּנִ֣ים אֲבוֹתָֽם׃	Children's children are the crown of old men; And the glory of children are their fathers.
7	לֹא־נָאוָ֣ה לְנָבָ֣ל שְׂפַת־יֶ֑תֶר אַ֝֗ף כִּֽי־לְנָדִ֥יב שְׂפַת־שָֽׁקֶר׃	Overbearing speech becometh not a churl; Much less do lying lips a prince.
8		A gift is as a precious stone in the eyes of him that hath it; Whithersoever he turneth, he prospereth.
9	מְֽכַסֶּה־פֶּ֭שַׁע מְבַקֵּ֣שׁ אַהֲבָ֑ה וְשֹׁנֶ֥ה בְ֝דָבָ֗ר מַפְרִ֥יד אַלּֽוּף׃	He that covereth a transgression seeketh love; But he that harpeth on a matter estrangeth a familiar friend.
10	תֵּ֣חַת גְּעָרָ֣ה בְמֵבִ֑ין מֵהַכּ֖וֹת כְּסִ֣יל מֵאָֽה׃	A rebuke entereth deeper into a man of understanding Than a hundred stripes into a fool.
11	אַךְ־מְרִ֥י יְבַקֶּשׁ־רָ֑ע וּמַלְאָ֥ךְ אַ֝כְזָרִ֗י יְשֻׁלַּח־בּֽוֹ׃	A rebellious man seeketh only evil; Therefore, a cruel messenger shall be sent against him.
12	פָּג֬וֹשׁ דֹּ֣ב שַׁכּ֣וּל בְּאִ֑ישׁ וְאַל־כְּ֝סִ֗יל בְּאִוַּלְתּֽוֹ	Let a bear robbed of her whelps meet a man, Rather than a fool in his folly.
13	מֵשִׁ֣יב רָ֭עָה תַּ֣חַת טוֹבָ֑ה לֹא־[תָמ֥וּשׁ] (תמיש) רָ֝עָ֗ה מִבֵּיתֽוֹ׃	Whoso rewardeth evil for good, Evil shall not depart from his house.
14	פּ֣וֹטֵֽר מַ֭יִם רֵאשִׁ֣ית מָד֑וֹן וְלִפְנֵ֥י הִ֝תְגַּלַּ֗ע הָרִ֥יב נְטֽוֹשׁ׃	The beginning of strife is as when one letteth out water; Therefore, leave off contention, before the quarrel break out.
15	מַצְדִּ֣יק רָ֭שָׁע וּמַרְשִׁ֣יעַ צַדִּ֑יק תּוֹעֲבַ֥ת יְ֝הֹוָ֗ה גַּם־שְׁנֵיהֶֽם׃	He that justifieth the wicked, and he that condemneth the righteous, Even they both are an abomination to the LORD.
16	לָמָּה־זֶּ֣ה מְחִ֣יר בְּיַד־כְּסִ֑יל לִקְנ֖וֹת חׇכְמָ֣ה וְלֶב־אָֽיִן	Wherefore is there a price in the hand of a fool To buy wisdom, seeing he hath no understanding?
17	בְּכׇל־עֵ֭ת אֹהֵ֣ב הָרֵ֑עַ וְאָ֥ח לְ֝צָרָ֗ה יִוָּלֵֽד׃	A friend loveth at all times, And a brother is born for adversity.
18	אָדָ֣ם חֲסַר־לֵ֭ב תּוֹקֵ֣עַ כָּ֑ף עֹרֵ֥ב עֲ֝רֻבָּ֗ה לִפְנֵ֥י רֵעֵֽהוּ׃	A man void of understanding is he that striketh hands, And becometh surety in the presence of his neighbour.
19	אֹ֣הֵֽב פֶּ֭שַׁע אֹהֵ֣ב מַצָּ֑ה מַגְבִּ֥יהַּ פִּ֝תְח֗וֹ מְבַקֶּשׁ־שָֽׁבֶר׃	He loveth transgression that loveth strife; He that exalteth his gate seeketh destruction.
20	עִקֶּשׁ־לֵ֭ב לֹ֣א יִמְצָא־ט֑וֹב וְנֶהְפָּ֥ךְ בִּ֝לְשׁוֹנ֗וֹ יִפּ֥וֹל בְּרָעָֽה׃	He that hath a forward heart findeth no good; And he that hath a perverse tongue falleth into evil.
21	יֹלֵ֣ד כְּ֭סִיל לְת֣וּגָה ל֑וֹ וְלֹא־יִ֝שְׂמַ֗ח אֲבִ֣י נָבָֽל׃	He that begetteth a fool doeth it to his sorrow; And the father of a churl hath no joy.
22	לֵ֣ב שָׂ֭מֵחַ יֵיטִ֣יב גֵּהָ֑ה וְר֥וּחַ נְ֝כֵאָ֗ה תְּיַבֶּשׁ־גָּֽרֶם׃	A merry heart is a good medicine; But a broken spirit drieth the bones.
23	שֹׁ֣חַד מֵ֭חֵק רָשָׁ֣ע יִקָּ֑ח לְ֝הַטּ֗וֹת אׇרְח֥וֹת מִשְׁפָּֽט׃	A wicked man taketh a gift out of the bosom, To pervert the ways of justice.
24	אֶת־פְּנֵ֣י מֵבִ֣ין חׇכְמָ֑ה וְעֵינֵ֥י כְ֝סִ֗יל בִּקְצֵה־אָֽרֶץ׃	Wisdom is before him that hath understanding; But the eyes of a fool are in the ends of the earth.
25	כַּ֣עַס לְ֭אָבִיו בֵּ֣ן כְּסִ֑יל וּ֝מֶ֗מֶר לְיֽוֹלַדְתּֽוֹ׃	A foolish son is vexation to his father, And bitterness to her that bore him.
26	גַּ֤ם עֲנ֣וֹשׁ לַצַּדִּ֣יק לֹא־ט֑וֹב לְהַכּ֖וֹת נְדִיבִ֣ים עַל־יֹֽשֶׁר׃	To punish also the righteous is not good, Nor to strike the noble for their uprightness.
27	חוֹשֵׂ֣ךְ אֲ֭מָרָיו יוֹדֵ֣עַ דָּ֑עַת (וקר) [יְקַר־]ר֝֗וּחַ אִ֣ישׁ תְּבוּנָֽה׃	He that spareth his words hath knowledge; And he that husbandeth his spirit is a man of discernment.
28	גַּ֤ם אֱוִ֣יל מַ֭חֲרִישׁ חָכָ֣ם יֵחָשֵׁ֑ב אֹטֵ֖ם שְׂפָתָ֣יו נָבֽוֹן׃	Even a fool, when he holdeth his peace, is counted wise; And he that shutteth his lips is esteemed as a man of understanding.

=== Textual witnesses ===
Some early manuscripts containing the text of this chapter in Hebrew are of the Masoretic Text, which includes the Aleppo Codex (10th century), and Codex Leningradensis (1008).

There is also a translation into Koine Greek known as the Septuagint, made in the last few centuries BC. Extant ancient manuscripts of the Septuagint version include Codex Vaticanus (B; $\mathfrak{G}$^{B}; 4th century), Codex Sinaiticus (S; BHK: $\mathfrak{G}$^{S}; 4th century), and Codex Alexandrinus (A; $\mathfrak{G}$^{A}; 5th century).

== Analysis ==
This chapter belongs to a section regarded as the second collection in the book of Proverbs (comprising Proverbs 10:1–22:16), also called "The First 'Solomonic' Collection" (the second one in Proverbs 25:1–29:27). The collection contains 375 sayings, each of which consists of two parallel phrases, except for Proverbs 19:7 which consists of three parts.

== Verse 1 ==
Better is a dry morsel with quietness

than a house full of sacrifices with strife.

- "Sacrifices of strife”: from Hebrew: זִבְחֵי־רִיב, zivkhe riv. The word “sacrifices” in relation to "house" may suggest a connection with the Temple (as in Proverbs 7:14) where people offer sacrifices, such as "peace offerings", and had plenty amount meat left over. It can also simply refer to a 'sumptuous meal' (Deuteronomy 12:15; Isaiah 34:6; Ezekiel 39:17) as in festivals.

The general idea is that a modest meal with peace and harmony ('quietness') round the table is better than a festive meal filled with resentments and rivalries or even open quarrels (cf. Proverbs 15:17).

== Verse 5 ==
Whoever mocks the poor reproaches his Maker,

and he who is glad at calamities will not be unpunished.

- "Reproaches": from the Hebrew word חֵרֵף, kheref, meaning “taunt” (as with a cutting taunt) or “insults” (NET Bible); in this case it may mean "showing contempt for" or "insulting" God, blaming God's providential control of the world or "offending the divine nature" of poverty by holding it up as a personal failure (cf. Proverbs 14:31).

== Verse 28 ==
Even a fool, when he holds his peace, is counted wise;

and he who shuts his lips is esteemed a man of understanding.

- "Esteemed a man of understanding": in Hebrew is using the Niphal participle in the declarative or estimative sense with stative verbs: “to be discerning” (Qal) becoming “to be declared discerning” (Niphal).

As 'silence is a mark of wisdom', a fool who could observe "restraint in speech" and "cool in spirit" (verse 27), instead of being 'hot-tempered' (cf. Proverbs 15:18), can conceal his/her folly and even be regarded as a wise person.

== Sources ==
- Aitken, K. T. (2007). "19. Proverbs". In Barton, John; Muddiman, John (eds.). The Oxford Bible Commentary (first (paperback) ed.). Oxford University Press. pp. 405–422. ISBN 978-0199277186.
- Alter, Robert (2010). The Wisdom Books: Job, Proverbs, and Ecclesiastes: A Translation with Commentary. W.W. Norton & Co. ISBN 978-0393080735.
- Coogan, Michael David (2007). Coogan, Michael David; Brettler, Marc Zvi; Newsom, Carol Ann; Perkins, Pheme (eds.). The New Oxford Annotated Bible with the Apocryphal/Deuterocanonical Books: New Revised Standard Version, Issue 48 (Augmented 3rd ed.). Oxford University Press. ISBN 9780195288810.
- Farmer, Kathleen A. (1998). "The Wisdom Books". In McKenzie, Steven L.; Graham, Matt Patrick (eds.). The Hebrew Bible Today: An Introduction to Critical Issues. Westminster John Knox Press. ISBN 978-0-66425652-4.
- Fox, Michael V. (2009). Proverbs 10-31: A New Translation with Introduction and Commentary. Anchor Yale Bible Commentaries. Yale University Press. ISBN 978-0300155563.
- Halley, Henry H. (1965). Halley's Bible Handbook: an abbreviated Bible commentary (24th (revised) ed.). Zondervan Publishing House. ISBN 0-310-25720-4.
- Perdue, Leo G. (2012). Proverbs Interpretation: A Bible Commentary for Teaching and Preaching. Presbyterian Publishing Corporation. ISBN 978-0664238841.
- Würthwein, Ernst (1995). The Text of the Old Testament. Translated by Rhodes, Erroll F. Grand Rapids, MI: Wm. B. Eerdmans. ISBN 0-8028-0788-7.
