= Proverbs 24 =

Twenty-fourth chapter of the biblical book of Proverbs

- ← chapter 23 chapter 25 →
- The whole Book of Proverbs in the Leningrad Codex (1008 C.E.) from an old facsimile edition.
- Book: Book of Proverbs
- Category: Ketuvim
- Christian Bible part: Old Testament
- Order in the Christian part: 21

Proverbs 24 is the 24th chapter of the Book of Proverbs in the Hebrew Bible or the Old Testament of the Christian Bible. The book is a compilation of several wisdom literature collections, with the heading in 1:1 may be intended to regard Solomon as the traditional author of the whole book, but the dates of the individual collections are difficult to determine, and the book probably obtained its final shape in the post-exilic period. This chapter specifically records "the sayings of wise".

== Text ==
=== Hebrew ===
The following table shows the Hebrew text of Proverbs 24 with vowels alongside an English translation based upon the JPS 1917 translation (now in the public domain).

Verse	Hebrew	English translation (JPS 1917)
1	אַל־תְּ֭קַנֵּא בְּאַנְשֵׁ֣י רָעָ֑ה וְאַל־תִּ֝תְאָ֗ו לִֽהְי֥וֹת אִתָּֽם׃	Be not thou envious of evil men, Neither desire to be with them.
2	כִּי־שֹׁ֭ד יֶהְגֶּ֣ה לִבָּ֑ם וְ֝עָמָ֗ל שִׂפְתֵיהֶ֥ם תְּדַבֵּֽרְנָה׃	For their heart studieth destruction, And their lips talk of mischief.
3	בְּ֭חׇכְמָה יִבָּ֣נֶה בָּ֑יִת וּ֝בִתְבוּנָ֗ה יִתְכּוֹנָֽן׃	Through wisdom is a house builded; And by understanding it is established;
4	וּ֭בְדַעַת חֲדָרִ֣ים יִמָּלְא֑וּ כׇּל־ה֖וֹן יָקָ֣ר וְנָעִֽים׃	And by knowledge are the chambers filled With all precious and pleasant riches.
5	גֶּבֶר־חָכָ֥ם בַּע֑וֹז וְאִֽישׁ־דַּ֝֗עַת מְאַמֶּץ־כֹּֽחַ׃	A wise man is strong; Yea, a man of knowledge increaseth strength.
6	כִּ֣י בְ֭תַחְבֻּלוֹת תַּעֲשֶׂה־לְּךָ֣ מִלְחָמָ֑ה וּ֝תְשׁוּעָ֗ה בְּרֹ֣ב יוֹעֵֽץ׃	For with wise advice thou shalt make thy war; And in the multitude of counsellors there is safety.
7	רָאמ֣וֹת לֶאֱוִ֣יל חׇכְמ֑וֹת בַּ֝שַּׁ֗עַר לֹ֣א יִפְתַּח־פִּֽיהוּ׃	Wisdom is as unattainable to a fool as corals; He openeth not his mouth in the gate.
8	מְחַשֵּׁ֥ב לְהָרֵ֑עַ ל֝֗וֹ בַּעַל־מְזִמּ֥וֹת יִקְרָֽאוּ׃	He that deviseth to do evil, Men shall call him a mischievous person.
9	זִמַּ֣ת אִוֶּ֣לֶת חַטָּ֑את וְתוֹעֲבַ֖ת לְאָדָ֣ם לֵֽץ׃	The thought of foolishness is sin; And the scorner is an abomination to men.
10	הִ֭תְרַפִּיתָ בְּי֥וֹם צָרָ֗ה צַ֣ר כֹּחֶֽכָה׃	If thou faint in the day of adversity, Thy strength is small indeed.
11	הַ֭צֵּל לְקֻחִ֣ים לַמָּ֑וֶת וּמָטִ֥ים לַ֝הֶ֗רֶג אִם־תַּחְשֽׂוֹךְ׃	Deliver them that are drawn unto death; And those that are ready to be slain wilt thou forbear to rescue?
12	כִּֽי־תֹאמַ֗ר הֵן֮ לֹֽא־יָדַ֢עְנ֫וּ זֶ֥ה הֲֽלֹא־תֹ֘כֵ֤ן לִבּ֨וֹת ׀ הֽוּא־יָבִ֗ין וְנֹצֵ֣ר נַ֭פְשְׁךָ ה֣וּא יֵדָ֑ע וְהֵשִׁ֖יב לְאָדָ֣ם כְּפׇעֳלֽוֹ׃	If thou sayest: ‘Behold, we knew not this’, Doth not He that weigheth the hearts consider it? And He that keepeth thy soul, doth not He know it? And shall not He render to every man according to his works?
13	אֱכׇל־בְּנִ֣י דְבַ֣שׁ כִּי־ט֑וֹב וְנֹ֥פֶת מָ֝ת֗וֹק עַל־חִכֶּֽךָ׃	My son, eat thou honey, for it is good, And the honeycomb is sweet to thy taste;
14	כֵּ֤ן ׀ דְּעֶ֥ה חׇכְמָ֗ה לְנַ֫פְשֶׁ֥ךָ אִם־מָ֭צָאתָ וְיֵ֣שׁ אַחֲרִ֑ית וְ֝תִקְוָתְךָ֗ לֹ֣א תִכָּרֵֽת׃	So know thou wisdom to be unto thy soul; If thou hast found it, then shall there be a future, And thy hope shall not be cut off.
15	אַל־תֶּאֱרֹ֣ב רָ֭שָׁע לִנְוֵ֣ה צַדִּ֑יק אַֽל־תְּשַׁדֵּ֥ד רִבְצֽוֹ׃	Lie not in wait, O wicked man, against the dwelling of the righteous, Spoil not his resting-place;
16	כִּ֤י שֶׁ֨בַע ׀ יִפּ֣וֹל צַדִּ֣יק וָקָ֑ם וּ֝רְשָׁעִ֗ים יִכָּשְׁל֥וּ בְרָעָֽה׃	For a righteous man falleth seven times, and riseth up again, But the wicked stumble under adversity.
17	בִּנְפֹ֣ל (אויביך) [א֭וֹיִבְךָ] אַל־תִּשְׂמָ֑ח וּ֝בִכָּשְׁל֗וֹ אַל־יָגֵ֥ל לִבֶּֽךָ׃	Rejoice not when thine enemy falleth, And let not thy heart be glad when he stumbleth;
18	פֶּן־יִרְאֶ֣ה יְ֭הֹוָה וְרַ֣ע בְּעֵינָ֑יו וְהֵשִׁ֖יב מֵעָלָ֣יו אַפּֽוֹ׃	Lest the LORD see it, and it displease Him, And He turn away His wrath from him.
19	אַל־תִּתְחַ֥ר בַּמְּרֵעִ֑ים אַל־תְּ֝קַנֵּ֗א בָּֽרְשָׁעִֽים׃	Fret not thyself because of evildoers, Neither be thou envious at the wicked;
20	כִּ֤י ׀ לֹא־תִהְיֶ֣ה אַחֲרִ֣ית לָרָ֑ע נֵ֖ר רְשָׁעִ֣ים יִדְעָֽךְ׃	For there will be no future to the evil man, The lamp of the wicked shall be put out.
21	יְרָא־אֶת־יְהֹוָ֣ה בְּנִ֣י וָמֶ֑לֶךְ עִם־שׁ֝וֹנִ֗ים אַל־תִּתְעָרָֽב׃	My son, fear thou the LORD and the king, And meddle not with them that are given to change;
22	כִּֽי־פִ֭תְאֹם יָק֣וּם אֵידָ֑ם וּפִ֥יד שְׁ֝נֵיהֶ֗ם מִ֣י יוֹדֵֽעַ׃	For their calamity shall rise suddenly; And who knoweth the ruin from them both?
23	גַּם־אֵ֥לֶּה לַחֲכָמִ֑ים הַֽכֵּר־פָּנִ֖ים בְּמִשְׁפָּ֣ט בַּל־טֽוֹב׃	These also are sayings of the wise. To have respect of persons in judgment is not good.
24	אֹ֤מֵ֨ר ׀ לְרָשָׁע֮ צַדִּ֢יק אָ֥֫תָּה יִקְּבֻ֥הוּ עַמִּ֑ים יִזְעָמ֥וּהוּ לְאֻמִּֽים׃	He that saith unto the wicked: ‘Thou art righteous’, Peoples shall curse him, nations shall execrate him;
25	וְלַמּוֹכִיחִ֥ים יִנְעָ֑ם וַ֝עֲלֵיהֶ֗ם תָּב֥וֹא בִרְכַּת־טֽוֹב׃	But to them that decide justly shall be delight, And a good blessing shall come upon them.
26	שְׂפָתַ֥יִם יִשָּׁ֑ק מֵ֝שִׁ֗יב דְּבָרִ֥ים נְכֹחִֽים׃	He kisseth the lips That giveth a right answer.
27	הָ֘כֵ֤ן בַּח֨וּץ ׀ מְלַאכְתֶּ֗ךָ וְעַתְּדָ֣הּ בַּשָּׂדֶ֣ה לָ֑ךְ אַ֝חַ֗ר וּבָנִ֥יתָ בֵיתֶֽךָ׃	Prepare thy work without, And make it fit for thyself in the field; And afterwards build thy house.
28	אַל־תְּהִ֣י עֵד־חִנָּ֣ם בְּרֵעֶ֑ךָ וַ֝הֲפִתִּ֗יתָ בִּשְׂפָתֶֽיךָ׃	Be not a witness against thy neighbour without cause; And deceive not with thy lips.
29	אַל־תֹּאמַ֗ר כַּאֲשֶׁ֣ר עָֽשָׂה־לִ֭י כֵּ֤ן אֶעֱשֶׂה־לּ֑וֹ אָשִׁ֖יב לָאִ֣ישׁ כְּפׇעֳלֽוֹ׃	Say not: ‘I will do so to him as he hath done to me; I will render to the man according to his work.’
30	עַל־שְׂדֵ֣ה אִישׁ־עָצֵ֣ל עָבַ֑רְתִּי וְעַל־כֶּ֝֗רֶם אָדָ֥ם חֲסַר־לֵֽב׃	I went by the field of the slothful, And by the vineyard of the man void of understanding;
31	וְהִנֵּ֨ה עָ֘לָ֤ה כֻלּ֨וֹ ׀ קִמְּשֹׂנִ֗ים כָּסּ֣וּ פָנָ֣יו חֲרֻלִּ֑ים וְגֶ֖דֶר אֲבָנָ֣יו נֶהֱרָֽסָה׃	And, lo, it was all grown over with thistles, The face thereof was covered with nettles, And the stone wall thereof was broken down.
32	וָאֶחֱזֶ֣ה אָֽ֭נֹכִי אָשִׁ֣ית לִבִּ֑י רָ֝אִ֗יתִי לָקַ֥חְתִּי מוּסָֽר׃	Then I beheld, and considered well; I saw, and received instruction.
33	מְעַ֣ט שֵׁ֭נוֹת מְעַ֣ט תְּנוּמ֑וֹת מְעַ֓ט ׀ חִבֻּ֖ק יָדַ֣יִם לִשְׁכָּֽב׃	’Yet a little sleep, a little slumber, A little folding of the hands to sleep’—
34	וּבָֽא־מִתְהַלֵּ֥ךְ רֵישֶׁ֑ךָ וּ֝מַחְסֹרֶ֗יךָ כְּאִ֣ישׁ מָגֵֽן׃	So shall thy poverty come as a runner, And thy want as an armed man.

=== Textual witnesses ===
Some early manuscripts containing the text of this chapter in Hebrew are of the Masoretic Text, which includes the Aleppo Codex (10th century), and Codex Leningradensis (1008).

There is also a translation into Koine Greek known as the Septuagint, made in the last few centuries BC. Extant ancient manuscripts of the Septuagint version include Codex Vaticanus (B; $\mathfrak{G}$^{B}; 4th century), Codex Sinaiticus (S; BHK: $\mathfrak{G}$^{S}; 4th century), and Codex Alexandrinus (A; $\mathfrak{G}$^{A}; 5th century).

== Analysis ==
Verses 1–22 is a part of the third collection in the book of Proverbs (comprising Proverbs 22:17–24:22), which consists of seven instructions of various lengths:

- 1st instruction (22:17–23:11)
- 2nd instruction (23:12–18)
- 3rd instruction (23:19–21)
- 4th instruction (23:22–25)
- 5th instruction (23:26–24:12)
- 6th instruction (24:13–20) and
- 7th instruction (24:21–22)

The sayings are predominantly in the form of synonymous parallelism, preceded by a general superscription of the entire collection in 22:17a: "The words of the wise" (or "Sayings of the Wise"). This collection consists of an introduction that the youths should be instructed and exhorted to listen to and obey their "teachers" (parents), followed by a series of admonitions and prohibitions coupled with a variety of clauses, primarily presented in short parental instructions (cf. 23:15, 22; 24:13, 21).

The remaining verses of this chapter (24:23–34) form the fourth collection in the book, introduced by a superscription "These also are sayings of the wise" (24:23a).

== Sayings of the Wise (24:1–22) ==
This section concludes a collection titled "Sayings of the Wise" (22:17), with 3 sets of instruction, one as a continuation from Proverbs 23:16.until 24:12, followed by 24:13–20 and 24:21–22. The instructions are likely given by a teacher in the context of a royal school during the monarchical period. The Greek Septuagint version contains five additional verses after verse 22, mainly on 'the wrath of the king'.

=== Verse 3 ===
Through wisdom is a house built

and by understanding it is established;

The 'building of the house' in verses 3-4 parallels to the building of the house by woman Wisdom in Proverbs 9:1, here stating that wisdom is 'the key to the prosperity of the family', as well as 'the key to healthy and harmonious family relationships'.

=== Verse 16 ===
For a righteous man may fall seven times
And rise again,
But the wicked shall fall by calamity.

- "For": is translated from the Hebrew clause כִּי, ki, which position at the beginning of the sentence could be interpreted as 'temporal, conditional, or emphatic'; that is 'the righteous keep getting up and going again'

== Further sayings of the Wise (24:23–34) ==
The whole section is the fourth collection in the book of Proverbs, consisting of:

- a superscription (24:23a; "These also are sayings of the wise")
- a discourse on judgment (24:23b-26, 28–29), and
- an autobiographical discourse on household labor (24:27, 30–34).

The first part of the collection (verses 23–29) contains warnings against partiality when judging (verses 23–25) or false testimony when being a witness (verse 28; cf. 18:5; 28:21). The second part (verses 30–34) provides an example story of being lazy and its consequences (cf. 7:6–23) reinforcing the lesson of the diligent ant in 6:10-11. The instruction is given as such so it can be perceived 'through the eye as well as the ear' ('saw... considered... received instruction', verse 32).

=== Verse 28 ===
Be not a witness against your neighbor without cause, and do not deceive with your lips.

- "Without cause": this expression could mean 'without necessity' (mischievously) or 'without grounds' (falsely), either of them amounts to perjury (verse 28b).

== Uses ==
The fry boats' bottom of In-N-Out Burger has the text "PROVERBS 24:16", which refers to the 16th verse of this chapter.

== See also ==
- Enemy
- Envy
- Evil
- Foolishness
- Knowledge
- Poverty
- Sin
- Righteousness
- Wickedness
- Wisdom
- YHWH
- Related Bible parts: Psalm 7, Proverbs 9, Proverbs 18, Proverbs 22, Proverbs 23, Proverbs 28

== Sources ==
- Aitken, K. T. (2007). "19. Proverbs". In Barton, John; Muddiman, John (eds.). The Oxford Bible Commentary (first (paperback) ed.). Oxford University Press. pp. 405–422. ISBN 978-0199277186.
- Alter, Robert (2010). The Wisdom Books: Job, Proverbs, and Ecclesiastes: A Translation with Commentary. W.W. Norton & Co. ISBN 978-0393080735.
- Coogan, Michael David (2007). Coogan, Michael David; Brettler, Marc Zvi; Newsom, Carol Ann; Perkins, Pheme (eds.). The New Oxford Annotated Bible with the Apocryphal/Deuterocanonical Books: New Revised Standard Version, Issue 48 (Augmented 3rd ed.). Oxford University Press. ISBN 9780195288810.
- Fox, Michael V. (2009). Proverbs 10-31: A New Translation with Introduction and Commentary. Anchor Yale Bible Commentaries. Yale University Press. ISBN 978-0300155563.
- Halley, Henry H. (1965). Halley's Bible Handbook: an abbreviated Bible commentary (24th (revised) ed.). Zondervan Publishing House. ISBN 0-310-25720-4.
- Perdue, Leo G. (2012). Proverbs Interpretation: A Bible Commentary for Teaching and Preaching. Presbyterian Publishing Corporation. ISBN 978-0664238841.
- Würthwein, Ernst (1995). The Text of the Old Testament. Translated by Rhodes, Erroll F. Grand Rapids, MI: Wm. B. Eerdmans. ISBN 0-8028-0788-7.
