= Naive (disambiguation) =

Naive or naïve indicates having or showing a lack of experience, understanding or sophistication.

Naive or naïve may also refer to:

== Music ==
- Naïve Records, a French record label
- Naïve (album), 1990 album by KMFDM
- Naive, 2008 album by Micky & the Motorcars
- Naive, 1985 album by synthpop band Dalek I Love You
- "Naïve" (song), a 2006 song by The Kooks

== Biology and medicine ==
- Drug-naïve, a patient who has not previously used a particular drug or someone who has not been exposed previously to an antigen
- Ecological naïveté, the habit of inexperienced animals not fearing predators
- Naive B cell, a type of T cell
- Naive T cell, a type of T cell
- Vaccine-naive

== Mathematics and computer science ==
- Naïve algorithm, a very simple solution to a problem that has a very high time- or memory complexity
- Naive Bayes classifier, a simple probabilistic classifier
- Naive set theory, a non-axiomatic approach to set theory, in mathematics

== See also ==
- Naïve art, art created by untrained artists, or artists aspiring to naïve realisations
- Naïve realism, a theory of perception thought to be representative of most people's understanding and method of interpretation of their perceptions
- Naïve. Super, a 1996 novel by the Norwegian Erlend Loe
- Naive John (born 1962), British artist and figurative painter
- Naïve empiricism, a term used in several ways in different fields
- Ingénue (disambiguation)
