= Proverbs 19 =

Nineteenth chapter of the biblical book of Proverbs

- ← chapter 18 chapter 20 →
- The whole Book of Proverbs in the Leningrad Codex (1008 C.E.) from an old facsimile edition.
- Book: Book of Proverbs
- Category: Ketuvim
- Christian Bible part: Old Testament
- Order in the Christian part: 21

Proverbs 19 is the nineteenth chapter of the Book of Proverbs in the Hebrew Bible or the Old Testament of the Christian Bible. The book is a compilation of several wisdom literature collections, with the heading in 1:1 may be intended to regard Solomon as the traditional author of the whole book, but the dates of the individual collections are difficult to determine, and the book probably obtained its final shape in the post-exilic period. This chapter is a part of the second collection of the book.

== Text ==
=== Hebrew ===
The following table shows the Hebrew text of Proverbs 19 with vowels alongside an English translation based upon the JPS 1917 translation (now in the public domain).

Verse	Hebrew	English translation (JPS 1917)
1	טֽוֹב־רָ֭שׁ הוֹלֵ֣ךְ בְּתֻמּ֑וֹ מֵעִקֵּ֥שׁ שְׂ֝פָתָ֗יו וְה֣וּא כְסִֽיל׃	Better is the poor that walketh in his integrity Than he that is perverse in his lips and a fool at the same time.
2	גַּ֤ם בְּלֹא־דַ֣עַת נֶ֣פֶשׁ לֹא־ט֑וֹב וְאָ֖ץ בְּרַגְלַ֣יִם חוֹטֵֽא׃	Also, that the soul be without knowledge is not good; And he that hasteth with his feet sinneth.
3	אִוֶּ֣לֶת אָ֭דָם תְּסַלֵּ֣ף דַּרְכּ֑וֹ וְעַל־יְ֝הֹוָ֗ה יִזְעַ֥ף לִבּֽוֹ׃	The foolishness of man perverteth his way; And his heart fretteth against the LORD.
4	ה֗וֹן יֹ֭סִיף רֵעִ֣ים רַבִּ֑ים וְ֝דָ֗ל מֵרֵעֵ֥הוּ יִפָּרֵֽד׃	Wealth addeth many friends; But as for the poor, his friend separateth himself from him.
5	עֵ֣ד שְׁ֭קָרִים לֹ֣א יִנָּקֶ֑ה וְיָפִ֥יחַ כְּ֝זָבִ֗ים לֹ֣א יִמָּלֵֽט׃	A false witness shall not be unpunished; And he that breatheth forth lies shall not escape.
6	רַ֭בִּים יְחַלּ֣וּ פְנֵֽי־נָדִ֑יב וְכׇל־הָ֝רֵ֗עַ לְאִ֣ישׁ מַתָּֽן׃	Many will entreat the favour of the liberal man; And every man is a friend to him that giveth gifts.
7	כׇּ֥ל־אֲחֵי־רָ֨שׁ ׀ שְֽׂנֵאֻ֗הוּ אַ֤ף כִּ֣י מְ֭רֵעֵהוּ רָחֲק֣וּ מִמֶּ֑נּוּ מְרַדֵּ֖ף אֲמָרִ֣ים (לא) [לוֹ־]הֵֽמָּה׃	All the brethren of the poor do hate him; How much more do his friends go far from him! He that pursueth words, they turn against him.
8	קֹֽנֶה־לֵּ֭ב אֹהֵ֣ב נַפְשׁ֑וֹ שֹׁמֵ֥ר תְּ֝בוּנָ֗ה לִמְצֹא־טֽוֹב׃	He that getteth wisdom loveth his own soul; He that keepeth understanding shall find good.
9	עֵ֣ד שְׁ֭קָרִים לֹ֣א יִנָּקֶ֑ה וְיָפִ֖יחַ כְּזָבִ֣ים יֹאבֵֽד׃	A false witness shall not be unpunished; And he that breatheth forth lies shall perish.
10	לֹא־נָאוֶ֣ה לִכְסִ֣יל תַּעֲנ֑וּג אַ֝֗ף כִּֽי־לְעֶ֤בֶד ׀ מְשֹׁ֬ל בְּשָׂרִֽים׃	Luxury is not seemly for a fool; Much less for a servant to have rule over princes.
11	שֵׂ֣כֶל אָ֭דָם הֶאֱרִ֣יךְ אַפּ֑וֹ וְ֝תִפְאַרְתּ֗וֹ עֲבֹ֣ר עַל־פָּֽשַׁע׃	It is the discretion of a man to be slow to anger, And it is his glory to pass over a transgression.
12	נַ֣הַם כַּ֭כְּפִיר זַ֣עַף מֶ֑לֶךְ וּכְטַ֖ל עַל־עֵ֣שֶׂב רְצוֹנֽוֹ׃	The king's wrath is as the roaring of a lion; But his favour is as dew upon the grass.
13	הַוֺּ֣ת לְ֭אָבִיו בֵּ֣ן כְּסִ֑יל וְדֶ֥לֶף טֹ֝רֵ֗ד מִדְיְנֵ֥י אִשָּֽׁה׃	A foolish son is the calamity of his father; And the contentions of a wife are a continual dropping.
14	בַּ֣יִת וָ֭הוֹן נַחֲלַ֣ת אָב֑וֹת וּ֝מֵיְהֹוָ֗ה אִשָּׁ֥ה מַשְׂכָּֽלֶת׃	House and riches are the inheritance of fathers; But a prudent wife is from the LORD.
15	עַ֭צְלָה תַּפִּ֣יל תַּרְדֵּמָ֑ה וְנֶ֖פֶשׁ רְמִיָּ֣ה תִרְעָֽב׃	Slothfulness casteth into a deep sleep; And the idle soul shall suffer hunger.
16	שֹׁמֵ֣ר מִ֭צְוָה שֹׁמֵ֣ר נַפְשׁ֑וֹ בּוֹזֵ֖ה דְרָכָ֣יו (יומת) [יָמֽוּת]׃	He that keepeth the commandment keepeth his soul; But he that despiseth His ways shall die.
17	מַלְוֵ֣ה יְ֭הֹוָה ח֣וֹנֵֽן דָּ֑ל וּ֝גְמֻל֗וֹ יְשַׁלֶּם־לֽוֹ׃	He that is gracious unto the poor lendeth unto the LORD; And his good deed will He repay unto him.
18	יַסֵּ֣ר בִּ֭נְךָ כִּֽי־יֵ֣שׁ תִּקְוָ֑ה וְאֶל־הֲ֝מִית֗וֹ אַל־תִּשָּׂ֥א נַפְשֶֽׁךָ׃	Chasten thy son, for there is hope; But set not thy heart on his destruction. .
19	(גרל) [גְּֽדׇל־]חֵ֭מָה נֹ֣שֵׂא עֹ֑נֶשׁ כִּ֥י אִם־תַּ֝צִּ֗יל וְע֣וֹד תּוֹסִֽף׃	A man of great wrath shall suffer punishment; For if thou interpose, thou wilt add thereto.
20	שְׁמַ֣ע עֵ֭צָה וְקַבֵּ֣ל מוּסָ֑ר לְ֝מַ֗עַן תֶּחְכַּ֥ם בְּאַחֲרִיתֶֽךָ׃	Hear counsel, and receive instruction, That thou mayest be wise in thy latter end.
21	רַבּ֣וֹת מַחֲשָׁב֣וֹת בְּלֶב־אִ֑ישׁ וַעֲצַ֥ת יְ֝הֹוָ֗ה הִ֣יא תָקֽוּם׃	There are many devices in a man's heart; But the counsel of the LORD, that shall stand.
22	תַּאֲוַ֣ת אָדָ֣ם חַסְדּ֑וֹ וְטֽוֹב־רָ֝֗שׁ מֵאִ֥ישׁ כָּזָֽב׃	The lust of a man is his shame; And a poor man is better than a liar.
23	יִרְאַ֣ת יְהֹוָ֣ה לְחַיִּ֑ים וְשָׂבֵ֥עַ יָ֝לִ֗ין בַּל־יִפָּ֥קֶד רָֽע׃	The fear of the LORD tendeth to life; And he that hath it shall abide satisfied, He shall not be visited with evil
24	טָ֘מַ֤ן עָצֵ֣ל יָ֭דוֹ בַּצַּלָּ֑חַת גַּם־אֶל־פִּ֝֗יהוּ לֹ֣א יְשִׁיבֶֽנָּה׃	The sluggard burieth his hand in the dish, And will not so much as bring it back to his mouth.
25	לֵ֣ץ תַּ֭כֶּה וּפֶ֣תִי יַעְרִ֑ם וְהוֹכִ֥יחַ לְ֝נָב֗וֹן יָבִ֥ין דָּֽעַת׃	When thou smitest a scorner, the simple will become prudent; And when one that hath understanding is reproved, he will understand knowledge.
26	מְֽשַׁדֶּד־אָ֭ב יַבְרִ֣יחַ אֵ֑ם בֵּ֝֗ן מֵבִ֥ישׁ וּמַחְפִּֽיר׃	A son that dealeth shamefully and reproachfully Will despoil his father, and chase away his mother.
27	חֲֽדַל־בְּ֭נִי לִשְׁמֹ֣עַ מוּסָ֑ר לִ֝שְׁג֗וֹת מֵאִמְרֵי־דָֽעַת׃	Cease, my son, to hear the instruction That causeth to err from the words of knowledge.
28	עֵ֣ד בְּ֭לִיַּעַל יָלִ֣יץ מִשְׁפָּ֑ט וּפִ֥י רְ֝שָׁעִ֗ים יְבַלַּע־אָֽוֶן	An ungodly witness mocketh at right; And the mouth of the wicked devoureth iniquity.
29	נָכ֣וֹנוּ לַלֵּצִ֣ים שְׁפָטִ֑ים וּ֝מַהֲלֻמ֗וֹת לְגֵ֣ו כְּסִילִֽים׃	Judgments are prepared for scorners, And stripes for the back of fools.

=== Textual witnesses ===
Some early manuscripts containing the text of this chapter in Hebrew are of the Masoretic Text, which includes the Aleppo Codex (10th century), and Codex Leningradensis (1008).

There is also a translation into Koine Greek known as the Septuagint, made in the last few centuries BC. Extant ancient manuscripts of the Septuagint version include Codex Vaticanus (B; $\mathfrak{G}$^{B}; 4th century), Codex Sinaiticus (S; BHK: $\mathfrak{G}$^{S}; 4th century), and Codex Alexandrinus (A; $\mathfrak{G}$^{A}; 5th century).

== Parashot ==
The parashah sections listed here are based on the Aleppo Codex. {P}: open parashah.

{P} 19:10–29; 20:1–30; 21:1–30 {P} 21:31; 22:1–29 {P} (Note: After a centered title: "The Proverbs of Solomon" (Proverbs 10:1a), there are no parashah divisions until before 19:10, an unusually large amount of unbroken text (278 verses).)

== Analysis ==
This chapter belongs to a section regarded as the second collection in the book of Proverbs (comprising Proverbs 10:1–22:16), also called "The First 'Solomonic' Collection" (the second one in Proverbs 25:1–29:27). The collection contains 375 sayings, each of which consists of two parallel phrases, except for Proverbs 19:7 which consists of three parts.

== Verse 1 ==
Better is the poor who walks in his integrity

than he who is perverse in his lips and is a fool.

- "Fool": following Masoretic Text and Septuagint, whereas the Syriac and Targum read “rich”. The Hebrew phrase construction uses וְהוּא, vehuʾ, "and he [is]," before the word "fool", so it may be rendered "one who is perverse while a fool" or "a fool at the same time." This verse is almost identical with verse 28:6, which contrasts the poor with the rich. A poor person who has maintained his integrity is better off compared to the fool who lied and cheated his way to success (cf. Proverbs 16:8). The second line of verse 22 makes a similar contrast between the poor and the liar, but the connection to its first line is uncertain.

== Verse 7 ==
All the brothers of the poor hate him;

how much more do his friends go far from him!

He pursues them with words, yet they abandon him.

- "Hate him" translated from the verb שָׂנֵא, saneʾ, which may be rendered as "reject" or "shunned" (NIV), basically 'to have nothing to do with him'. If relatives do this, how much more will the poor person's friends do so. Whereas wealth attracts friends, poverty repels them (cf. verse 4; Proverbs 14:20), and while the relatives of the poor may have little choice but to support, friends and neighbours will try to avoid them (verse 7a).

Among 375 "proverbs of Solomon" in Proverbs 10:1–22:16, only this one has three lines instead of two lines.

== Verse 21 ==
There are many plans in a man’s heart,

Nevertheless the Lord’s counsel—that will stand.

- "Plans": from the Hebrew verb חָשַׁב, khashav, "to think; to reckon; to devise", which are many in human heart, but only those approved by God will succeed.

== See also ==
- Alcohol in the Bible
- Charity
- Creator deity
- Divine providence
- Evil
- Mitzvah
- Nephesh
- Omniscience
- Sin
- Soul in the Bible
- Understanding
- YHWH
- Related Bible parts: Proverbs 9, Proverbs 18, Proverbs 22, Proverbs 23

== Sources ==
- Aitken, K. T. (2007). "19. Proverbs". In Barton, John; Muddiman, John (eds.). The Oxford Bible Commentary (first (paperback) ed.). Oxford University Press. pp. 405–422. ISBN 978-0199277186.
- Alter, Robert (2010). The Wisdom Books: Job, Proverbs, and Ecclesiastes: A Translation with Commentary. W.W. Norton & Co. ISBN 978-0393080735.
- Coogan, Michael David (2007). Coogan, Michael David; Brettler, Marc Zvi; Newsom, Carol Ann; Perkins, Pheme (eds.). The New Oxford Annotated Bible with the Apocryphal/Deuterocanonical Books: New Revised Standard Version, Issue 48 (Augmented 3rd ed.). Oxford University Press. ISBN 9780195288810.
- Farmer, Kathleen A. (1998). "The Wisdom Books". In McKenzie, Steven L.; Graham, Matt Patrick (eds.). The Hebrew Bible Today: An Introduction to Critical Issues. Westminster John Knox Press. ISBN 978-0-66425652-4.
- Fox, Michael V. (2009). Proverbs 10-31: A New Translation with Introduction and Commentary. Anchor Yale Bible Commentaries. Yale University Press. ISBN 978-0300155563.
- Halley, Henry H. (1965). Halley's Bible Handbook: an abbreviated Bible commentary (24th (revised) ed.). Zondervan Publishing House. ISBN 0-310-25720-4.
- Perdue, Leo G. (2012). Proverbs Interpretation: A Bible Commentary for Teaching and Preaching. Presbyterian Publishing Corporation. ISBN 978-0664238841.
- Würthwein, Ernst (1995). The Text of the Old Testament. Translated by Rhodes, Erroll F. Grand Rapids, MI: Wm. B. Eerdmans. ISBN 0-8028-0788-7.
