= Ingénue (disambiguation) =

An ingénue is a stock character in literature, film and theatre.

Ingénue may also refer to:

- A naive person
- Ingénue (album), a 1992 album by k.d. lang
- "Ingenue", a song by Atoms for Peace from the album Amok
- The Ingenues, an all-girls vaudeville-style jazz band

== See also ==
- Naive (disambiguation)
- L'Ingénu, a 1767 novella by Voltaire
- Ingenu, an internet-of-things technology company
