= Proverbs 18 =

Eighteenth chapter of the biblical book of Proverbs

- ← chapter 17 chapter 19 →
- The whole Book of Proverbs in the Leningrad Codex (1008 C.E.) from an old facsimile edition.
- Book: Book of Proverbs
- Category: Ketuvim
- Christian Bible part: Old Testament
- Order in the Christian part: 21

Proverbs 18 is the eighteenth chapter of the Book of Proverbs in the Hebrew Bible or the Old Testament of the Christian Bible. The book is a compilation of several wisdom literature collections, with the heading in 1:1 may be intended to regard Solomon as the traditional author of the whole book, but the dates of the individual collections are difficult to determine, and the book probably obtained its final shape in the post-exilic period. This chapter is a part of the second collection of the book.

== Text ==
=== Hebrew ===
The following table shows the Hebrew text of Proverbs 18 with vowels alongside an English translation based upon the JPS 1917 translation (now in the public domain).

Verse	Hebrew	English translation (JPS 1917)
1	לְֽ֭תַאֲוָה יְבַקֵּ֣שׁ נִפְרָ֑ד בְּכׇל־תּ֝וּשִׁיָּ֗ה יִתְגַּלָּֽע׃	He that separateth himself seeketh his own desire, And snarlest against all sound wisdom.
2	לֹא־יַחְפֹּ֣ץ כְּ֭סִיל בִּתְבוּנָ֑ה כִּ֝֗י אִֽם־בְּהִתְגַּלּ֥וֹת לִבּֽוֹ׃	A fool hath no delight in understanding, But only that his heart may lay itself bare.
3	בְּֽבוֹא־רָ֭שָׁע בָּ֣א גַם־בּ֑וּז וְֽעִם־קָל֥וֹן חֶרְפָּֽה׃	When the wicked cometh, there cometh also contempt, And with ignominy reproach.
4	מַ֣יִם עֲ֭מֻקִּים דִּבְרֵ֣י פִי־אִ֑ישׁ נַ֥חַל נֹ֝בֵ֗עַ מְק֣וֹר חׇכְמָֽה׃	The words of a man's mouth are as deep waters; A flowing brook, a fountain of wisdom.
5	שְׂאֵ֣ת פְּנֵֽי־רָשָׁ֣ע לֹא־ט֑וֹב לְהַטּ֥וֹת צַ֝דִּ֗יק בַּמִּשְׁפָּֽט׃	It is not good to respect the person of the wicked, So as to turn aside the righteous in judgment.
6	שִׂפְתֵ֣י כְ֭סִיל יָבֹ֣אוּ בְרִ֑יב וּ֝פִ֗יו לְֽמַהֲלֻמ֥וֹת יִקְרָֽא׃	A fool's lips enter into contention, And his mouth calleth for strokes.
7	פִּֽי־כְ֭סִיל מְחִתָּה־ל֑וֹ וּ֝שְׂפָתָ֗יו מוֹקֵ֥שׁ נַפְשֽׁוֹ׃	A fool's mouth is his ruin, And his lips are the snare of his soul.
8	דִּבְרֵ֣י נִ֭רְגָּן כְּמִֽתְלַהֲמִ֑ים וְ֝הֵ֗ם יָרְד֥וּ חַדְרֵי־בָֽטֶן׃	The words of a whisperer are as dainty morsels, And they go down into the innermost parts of the belly.
9	גַּ֭ם מִתְרַפֶּ֣ה בִמְלַאכְתּ֑וֹ אָ֥ח ה֝֗וּא לְבַ֣עַל מַשְׁחִֽית׃	Even one that is slack in his work Is brother to him that is a destroyer. .
10	מִגְדַּל־עֹ֭ז שֵׁ֣ם יְהֹוָ֑ה בּֽוֹ־יָר֖וּץ צַדִּ֣יק וְנִשְׂגָּֽב׃	The name of the LORD is a strong tower: The righteous runneth into it, and is set up on high.
11	ה֣וֹן עָ֭שִׁיר קִרְיַ֣ת עֻזּ֑וֹ וּכְחוֹמָ֥ה נִ֝שְׂגָּבָ֗ה בְּמַשְׂכִּתֽוֹ׃	The rich man's wealth is his strong city, And as a high wall in his own conceit.
12	לִפְנֵי־שֶׁ֭בֶר יִגְבַּ֣הּ לֶב־אִ֑ישׁ וְלִפְנֵ֖י כָב֣וֹד עֲנָוָֽה׃	Before destruction the heart of a man is haughty, And before honour goeth humility.
13	מֵשִׁ֣יב דָּ֭בָר בְּטֶ֣רֶם יִשְׁמָ֑ע אִוֶּ֥לֶת הִיא־ל֝֗וֹ וּכְלִמָּֽה׃	He that giveth answer before he heareth, It is folly and confusion unto him.
14	רֽוּחַ־אִ֭ישׁ יְכַלְכֵּ֣ל מַחֲלֵ֑הוּ וְר֥וּחַ נְ֝כֵאָ֗ה מִ֣י יִשָּׂאֶֽנָּה׃	The spirit of a man will sustain his infirmity; But a broken spirit who can bear?
15	לֵ֣ב נָ֭בוֹן יִקְנֶה־דָּ֑עַת וְאֹ֥זֶן חֲ֝כָמִ֗ים תְּבַקֶּשׁ־דָּֽעַת׃	The heart of the prudent getteth knowledge; And the ear of the wise seeketh knowledge.
16	מַתָּ֣ן אָ֭דָם יַרְחִ֣יב ל֑וֹ וְלִפְנֵ֖י גְדֹלִ֣ים יַנְחֶֽנּוּ׃	A man's gift maketh room for him, And bringeth him before great men.
17	צַדִּ֣יק הָרִאשׁ֣וֹן בְּרִיב֑וֹ (יבא) [וּבָֽא־]רֵ֝עֵ֗הוּ וַחֲקָרֽוֹ׃	He that pleadeth his cause first seemeth just; But his neighbour cometh and searcheth him out.
18	מִ֭דְיָנִים יַשְׁבִּ֣ית הַגּוֹרָ֑ל וּבֵ֖ין עֲצוּמִ֣ים יַפְרִֽיד׃	The lot causeth strife to cease, And parteth asunder the contentious.
19	אָ֗ח נִפְשָׁ֥ע מִקִּרְיַת־עֹ֑ז (ומדונים) [וּ֝מִדְיָנִ֗ים] כִּבְרִ֥יחַ אַרְמֽוֹן׃	A brother offended is harder to be won than a strong city; And their contentions are like the bars of a castle.
20	מִפְּרִ֣י פִי־אִ֭ישׁ תִּשְׂבַּ֣ע בִּטְנ֑וֹ תְּבוּאַ֖ת שְׂפָתָ֣יו יִשְׂבָּֽע׃	A man's belly shall be filled with the fruit of his mouth; With the increase of his lips shall he be satisfied.
21	מָ֣וֶת וְ֭חַיִּים בְּיַד־לָשׁ֑וֹן וְ֝אֹהֲבֶ֗יהָ יֹאכַ֥ל פִּרְיָֽהּ׃	Death and life are in the power of the tongue; And they that indulge it shall eat the fruit thereof.
22	מָצָ֣א אִ֭שָּׁה מָ֣צָא ט֑וֹב וַיָּ֥פֶק רָ֝צ֗וֹן מֵיְהֹוָֽה׃	Whoso findeth a wife findeth a great good, And obtaineth favour of the LORD.
23	תַּחֲנוּנִ֥ים יְדַבֶּר־רָ֑שׁ וְ֝עָשִׁ֗יר יַעֲנֶ֥ה עַזּֽוֹת׃	The poor useth entreaties; But the rich answereth impudently.
24	אִ֣ישׁ רֵ֭עִים לְהִתְרֹעֵ֑עַ וְיֵ֥שׁ אֹ֝הֵ֗ב דָּבֵ֥ק מֵאָֽח׃	There are friends that one hath to his own hurt; But there is a friend that sticketh closer than a brother.

=== Textual witnesses ===
Some early manuscripts containing the text of this chapter in Hebrew are of the Masoretic Text, which includes the Aleppo Codex (10th century), and Codex Leningradensis (1008).

There is also a translation into Koine Greek known as the Septuagint, made in the last few centuries BC. Extant ancient manuscripts of the Septuagint version include Codex Vaticanus (B; $\mathfrak{G}$^{B}; 4th century), Codex Sinaiticus (S; BHK: $\mathfrak{G}$^{S}; 4th century), and Codex Alexandrinus (A; $\mathfrak{G}$^{A}; 5th century).

== Analysis ==
This chapter belongs to a section regarded as the second collection in the book of Proverbs (comprising Proverbs 10:1–22:16), also called "The First 'Solomonic' Collection" (the second one in Proverbs 25:1–29:27). The collection contains 375 sayings, each of which consists of two parallel phrases, except for Proverbs 19:7 which consists of three parts.

== Verse 1 ==
A man who isolates himself seeks his own desire;

He rages against all wise judgment.

- "Isolates himself": or "has separated himself” (cf. KJV, ASV, NASB), as the Hebrew word in Niphal participle functions substantively and has a reflexive nuance.
- "Wise judgment": or "sound wisdom".

A person of a misanthropic isolation described here is not merely anti-social, but becomes a problem for society since he will defy sound judgment.

== Verse 5 ==
It is not good to favor the wicked,

or to turn aside the righteous in judgment.

- "Not good": in form of a 'deliberate understatement to emphasize a worst-case scenario' (a figure of speech known as "tapeinosis"); can be rendered as “it is terrible!”
- "To favor" translated from the idiom שְׂאֵת פְּנֵי, seʾet pene, “lifting up the face of”, which means “to show partiality” in decisions (cf. Deuteronomy 10:17; Malachi 2:9), using the verbal form of the Qal infinitive construct from נָשָׂא, nasaʾ, that functions as the subject of the clause. This is probably related the custom of a ruler raising the face of a prostrate subject as a sign of favor (cf. Malachi 1:8).

While partiality in judgement is condemned in verse 5, verse 17 cautions against reaching a premature verdict before a case carefully receives cross-examination, and if legal processes could not resolve the case, it is to be submitted to divine arbitration (verse 18; cf. Proverbs 16:33).

== Verse 6 ==
The words of a fool start fights;
do him a favor and gag him.

== Verse 21 ==
Death and life are in the power of the tongue:

and they that love it shall eat the fruit thereof.

- "In the power of": or “in the hand of.”

== See also ==
- Alcohol in the Bible
- Business ethics
- Charity
- Child discipline
- Creator deity
- Deception
- Discretion
- Divine providence
- Evil
- Foolishness
- Fraud
- Gossip
- Humility
- Judgement
- Justice
- Knowledge
- Laziness
- Lie
- Mercy
- Mitzvah
- Nephesh
- Omniscience
- Parenting
- Poverty
- Pride
- Prudence
- Relativism
- Reputation
- Righteousness
- Robbery
- Sin
- Soul in the Bible
- Truth
- Understanding
- Wealth
- Wickedness
- Wisdom
- YHWH
- Related Bible parts: Deuteronomy 10, Proverbs 9, Proverbs 19, Proverbs 22, Proverbs 23, Malachi 1, Malachi 2

== Sources ==
- Aitken, K. T. (2007). "19. Proverbs". In Barton, John; Muddiman, John (eds.). The Oxford Bible Commentary (first (paperback) ed.). Oxford University Press. pp. 405–422. ISBN 978-0199277186.
- Alter, Robert (2010). The Wisdom Books: Job, Proverbs, and Ecclesiastes: A Translation with Commentary. W.W. Norton & Co. ISBN 978-0393080735.
- Coogan, Michael David (2007). Coogan, Michael David; Brettler, Marc Zvi; Newsom, Carol Ann; Perkins, Pheme (eds.). The New Oxford Annotated Bible with the Apocryphal/Deuterocanonical Books: New Revised Standard Version, Issue 48 (Augmented 3rd ed.). Oxford University Press. ISBN 9780195288810.
- Farmer, Kathleen A. (1998). "The Wisdom Books". In McKenzie, Steven L.; Graham, Matt Patrick (eds.). The Hebrew Bible Today: An Introduction to Critical Issues. Westminster John Knox Press. ISBN 978-0-66425652-4.
- Fox, Michael V. (2009). Proverbs 10-31: A New Translation with Introduction and Commentary. Anchor Yale Bible Commentaries. Yale University Press. ISBN 978-0300155563.
- Halley, Henry H. (1965). Halley's Bible Handbook: an abbreviated Bible commentary (24th (revised) ed.). Zondervan Publishing House. ISBN 0-310-25720-4.
- Perdue, Leo G. (2012). Proverbs Interpretation: A Bible Commentary for Teaching and Preaching. Presbyterian Publishing Corporation. ISBN 978-0664238841.
- Würthwein, Ernst (1995). The Text of the Old Testament. Translated by Rhodes, Erroll F. Grand Rapids, MI: Wm. B. Eerdmans. ISBN 0-8028-0788-7.
