= Proverbs 23 =

Twenty-third chapter of the biblical book of Proverbs

- ← chapter 22 chapter 24 →
- The whole Book of Proverbs in the Leningrad Codex (1008 C.E.) from an old facsimile edition.
- Book: Book of Proverbs
- Category: Ketuvim
- Christian Bible part: Old Testament
- Order in the Christian part: 21

Proverbs 23 is the 23rd chapter of the Book of Proverbs in the Hebrew Bible or the Old Testament of the Christian Bible. The book is a compilation of several wisdom literature collections, with the heading in 1:1 may be intended to regard Solomon as the traditional author of the whole book, but the dates of the individual collections are difficult to determine, and the book probably obtained its final shape in the post-exilic period. This chapter specifically records "the sayings of wise".

== Text ==
=== Hebrew ===
The following table shows the Hebrew text of Proverbs 23 with vowels alongside an English translation based upon the JPS 1917 translation (now in the public domain).

Verse	Hebrew	English translation (JPS 1917)
1	כִּֽי־תֵ֭שֵׁב לִלְח֣וֹם אֶת־מוֹשֵׁ֑ל בִּ֥ין תָּ֝בִ֗ין אֶת־אֲשֶׁ֥ר לְפָנֶֽיךָ׃	When thou sittest to eat with a ruler, consider well him that is before thee;
2	וְשַׂמְתָּ֣ שַׂכִּ֣ין בְּלֹעֶ֑ךָ אִם־בַּ֖עַל נֶ֣פֶשׁ אָֽתָּה׃	And put a knife to thy throat, if thou be a man given to appetite.
3	אַל־תִּ֭תְאָו לְמַטְעַמּוֹתָ֑יו וְ֝ה֗וּא לֶ֣חֶם כְּזָבִֽים׃	Be not desirous of his dainties; seeing they are deceitful food.
4	אַל־תִּיגַ֥ע לְֽהַעֲשִׁ֑יר מִֽבִּינָתְךָ֥ חֲדָֽל׃	Weary not thyself to be rich; Cease from thine own wisdom. .
5	(התעוף) [הֲתָ֤עִיף] עֵינֶ֥יךָ בּ֗וֹ וְֽאֵ֫ינֶ֥נּוּ כִּ֤י עָשֹׂ֣ה יַעֲשֶׂה־לּ֣וֹ כְנָפַ֑יִם כְּ֝נֶ֗שֶׁר (ועיף) [יָע֥וּף] הַשָּׁמָֽיִם׃	Wilt thou set thine eyes upon it? it is gone; For riches certainly make themselves wings, Like an eagle that flieth toward heaven.
6	אַל־תִּלְחַ֗ם אֶת־לֶ֭חֶם רַ֣ע עָ֑יִן וְאַל־תִּ֝תְאָ֗ו לְמַטְעַמֹּתָֽיו׃	Eat thou not the bread of him that hath an evil eye, Neither desire thou his dainties;
7	כִּ֤י ׀ כְּמ֥וֹ שָׁעַ֥ר בְּנַפְשׁ֗וֹ כֶּ֫ן־ה֥וּא אֱכ֣וֹל וּ֭שְׁתֵה יֹ֣אמַר לָ֑ךְ וְ֝לִבּ֗וֹ בַּל־עִמָּֽךְ׃	For as one that hath reckoned within himself, so is he: ‘Eat and drink’, saith he to thee; But his heart is not with thee.
8	פִּֽתְּךָ־אָכַ֥לְתָּ תְקִיאֶ֑נָּה וְ֝שִׁחַ֗תָּ דְּבָרֶ֥יךָ הַנְּעִימִֽים׃	The morsel which thou hast eaten shalt thou vomit up, And lose thy sweet words.
9	בְּאׇזְנֵ֣י כְ֭סִיל אַל־תְּדַבֵּ֑ר כִּֽי־יָ֝ב֗וּז לְשֵׂ֣כֶל מִלֶּֽיךָ׃	Speak not in the ears of a fool; for he will despise the wisdom of thy words.
10	אַל־תַּ֭סֵּג גְּב֣וּל עוֹלָ֑ם וּבִשְׂדֵ֥י יְ֝תוֹמִ֗ים אַל־תָּבֹֽא׃	Remove not the ancient landmark; and enter not into the fields of the fatherless;
11	כִּֽי־גֹאֲלָ֥ם חָזָ֑ק הֽוּא־יָרִ֖יב אֶת־רִיבָ֣ם אִתָּֽךְ׃	For their Redeemer is strong; He will plead their cause with thee.
12	הָבִ֣יאָה לַמּוּסָ֣ר לִבֶּ֑ךָ וְ֝אׇזְנֶ֗ךָ לְאִמְרֵי־דָֽעַת׃	Apply thy heart unto instruction, And thine ears to the words of knowledge.
13	אַל־תִּמְנַ֣ע מִנַּ֣עַר מוּסָ֑ר כִּֽי־תַכֶּ֥נּוּ בַ֝שֵּׁ֗בֶט לֹ֣א יָמֽוּת׃	Withhold not correction from the child; For though thou beat him with the rod, he will not die.
14	אַ֭תָּה בַּשֵּׁ֣בֶט תַּכֶּ֑נּוּ וְ֝נַפְשׁ֗וֹ מִשְּׁא֥וֹל תַּצִּֽיל׃	Thou beatest him with the rod, And wilt deliver his soul from the nether-world.
15	בְּ֭נִי אִם־חָכַ֣ם לִבֶּ֑ךָ יִשְׂמַ֖ח לִבִּ֣י גַם־אָֽנִי׃	My son, if thy heart be wise, My heart will be glad, even mine;
16	וְתַעְלֹ֥זְנָה כִלְיוֹתָ֑י בְּדַבֵּ֥ר שְׂ֝פָתֶ֗יךָ מֵישָׁרִֽים׃	Yea, my reins will rejoice, When thy lips speak right things.
17	אַל־יְקַנֵּ֣א לִ֭בְּךָ בַּחַטָּאִ֑ים כִּ֥י אִם־בְּיִרְאַת־יְ֝הֹוָ֗ה כׇּל־הַיּֽוֹם׃	Let not thy heart envy sinners, But be in the fear of the LORD all the day;
18	כִּ֭י אִם־יֵ֣שׁ אַחֲרִ֑ית וְ֝תִקְוָתְךָ֗ לֹ֣א תִכָּרֵֽת׃	For surely there is a future; And thy hope shall not be cut off.
19	שְׁמַע־אַתָּ֣ה בְנִ֣י וַחֲכָ֑ם וְאַשֵּׁ֖ר בַּדֶּ֣רֶךְ לִבֶּֽךָ׃	Hear thou, my son, and be wise, And guide thy heart in the way.
20	אַל־תְּהִ֥י בְסֹֽבְאֵי־יָ֑יִן בְּזֹלְלֵ֖י בָשָׂ֣ר לָֽמוֹ׃	Be not among winebibbers; Among gluttonous eaters of flesh;
21	כִּֽי־סֹבֵ֣א וְ֭זוֹלֵל יִוָּרֵ֑שׁ וּ֝קְרָעִ֗ים תַּלְבִּ֥ישׁ נוּמָֽה׃	For the drunkard and the glutton shall come to poverty; And drowsiness shall clothe a man with rags.
22	שְׁמַ֣ע לְ֭אָבִיךָ זֶ֣ה יְלָדֶ֑ךָ וְאַל־תָּ֝ב֗וּז כִּֽי־זָקְנָ֥ה אִמֶּֽךָ׃	Hearken unto thy father that begot thee, And despise not thy mother when she is old.
23	אֱמֶ֣ת קְ֭נֵה וְאַל־תִּמְכֹּ֑ר חׇכְמָ֖ה וּמוּסָ֣ר וּבִינָֽה׃	Buy the truth, and sell it not; also wisdom, and instruction, and understanding.
24	(גול) [גִּ֣יל] יָ֭גִיל אֲבִ֣י צַדִּ֑יק (יולד) [וְיוֹלֵ֥ד] חָ֝כָ֗ם (וישמח) [יִשְׂמַח־]בּֽוֹ׃	The father of the righteous will greatly rejoice; and he that begetteth a wise child will have joy of him.
25	יִֽשְׂמַח־אָבִ֥יךָ וְאִמֶּ֑ךָ וְ֝תָגֵ֗ל יוֹלַדְתֶּֽךָ׃	Let thy father and thy mother be glad, and let her that bore thee rejoice.
26	תְּנָה־בְנִ֣י לִבְּךָ֣ לִ֑י וְ֝עֵינֶ֗יךָ דְּרָכַ֥י (תרצנה) [תִּצֹּֽרְנָה]׃	My son, give me thy heart, and let thine eyes observe my ways. .
27	כִּֽי־שׁוּחָ֣ה עֲמֻקָּ֣ה זוֹנָ֑ה וּבְאֵ֥ר צָ֝רָ֗ה נׇכְרִיָּֽה׃	For a harlot is a deep ditch; and an alien woman is a narrow pit.
28	אַף־הִ֭יא כְּחֶ֣תֶף תֶּאֱרֹ֑ב וּ֝בוֹגְדִ֗ים בְּאָדָ֥ם תּוֹסִֽף׃	She also lieth in wait as a robber, and increaseth the faithless among men.
29	לְמִ֨י א֥וֹי לְמִ֢י אֲב֡וֹי לְמִ֤י (מדונים) [מִדְיָנִ֨ים ׀] לְמִ֥י שִׂ֗יחַ לְ֭מִי פְּצָעִ֣ים חִנָּ֑ם לְ֝מִ֗י חַכְלִל֥וּת עֵינָֽיִם׃	Who crieth: ‘Woe’? who: ‘Alas’? Who hath contentions? who hath raving? Who hath wounds without cause? Who hath redness of eyes?
30	לַֽמְאַחֲרִ֥ים עַל־הַיָּ֑יִן לַ֝בָּאִ֗ים לַחְקֹ֥ר מִמְסָֽךְ׃	They that tarry long at the wine; They that go to try mixed wine.
31	אַל־תֵּ֥רֶא יַּיִן֮ כִּ֤י יִתְאַ֫דָּ֥ם כִּֽי־יִתֵּ֣ן (בכיס) [בַּכּ֣וֹס] עֵינ֑וֹ יִ֝תְהַלֵּ֗ךְ בְּמֵֽישָׁרִֽים׃	Look not thou upon the wine when it is red, when it giveth its colour in the cup, When it glideth down smoothly;
32	אַ֭חֲרִיתוֹ כְּנָחָ֣שׁ יִשָּׁ֑ךְ וּֽכְצִפְעֹנִ֥י יַפְרִֽשׁ׃	At the last it biteth like a serpent, and stingeth like a basilisk.
33	עֵ֭ינֶיךָ יִרְא֣וּ זָר֑וֹת וְ֝לִבְּךָ֗ יְדַבֵּ֥ר תַּהְפֻּכֽוֹת׃	Thine eyes shall behold strange things, and thy heart shall utter confused things.
34	וְ֭הָיִיתָ כְּשֹׁכֵ֣ב בְּלֶב־יָ֑ם וּ֝כְשֹׁכֵ֗ב בְּרֹ֣אשׁ חִבֵּֽל׃	Yea, thou shalt be as he that lieth down in the midst of the sea, or as he that lieth upon the top of a mast.
35	הִכּ֥וּנִי בַל־חָלִיתִי֮ הֲלָמ֗וּנִי בַּל־יָ֫דָ֥עְתִּי מָתַ֥י אָקִ֑יץ א֝וֹסִ֗יף אֲבַקְשֶׁ֥נּוּ עֽוֹד׃	’They have struck me, and I felt it not, they have beaten me, and I knew it not; when shall I awake? I will seek it yet again.’

=== Textual witnesses ===
Some early manuscripts containing the text of this chapter in Hebrew are of the Masoretic Text, which includes the Aleppo Codex (10th century), and Codex Leningradensis (1008).

There is also a translation into Koine Greek known as the Septuagint, made in the last few centuries BC. Extant ancient manuscripts of the Septuagint version include Codex Vaticanus (B; $\mathfrak{G}$^{B}; 4th century), Codex Sinaiticus (S; BHK: $\mathfrak{G}$^{S}; 4th century), and Codex Alexandrinus (A; $\mathfrak{G}$^{A}; 5th century).

== Analysis ==
This chapter is a part of the third collection in the book of Proverbs (comprising Proverbs 22:17–24:22), which consists of seven instructions of various lengths:

- 1st instruction (22:17–23:11)
- 2nd instruction (23:12–18)
- 3rd instruction (23:19–21)
- 4th instruction (23:22–25)
- 5th instruction (23:26–24:12)
- 6th instruction (24:13–20) and
- 7th instruction (24:21–22)

The sayings are predominantly in the form of synonymous parallelism, preceded by a general superscription of the entire collection in 22:17a: "The words of the wise" (or "Sayings of the Wise"). This collection consists of an introduction that the youths should be instructed and exhorted to listen to and obey their "teachers" (parents), followed by a series of admonitions and prohibitions coupled with a variety of clauses, primarily presented in short parental instructions (cf. 23:15, 22; 24:13, 21).

The 'thirty sayings' (Proverbs 22:20) in this collection are thought to be modelled on the 'thirty chapters' in Egyptian Instruction of Amen-em-ope the son of Kanakht (most likely during the Ramesside Period ca. 1300–1075 BCE), although the parallels extend only in Proverbs 22:17–23:11 and the extent of the dependence is debatable.

== True riches (verses 1–21) ==
This section forms the body of a collection titled "Sayings of the Wise" (22:17), containing 5 of 7 sets of instruction. Verses 1–3 give some further advice about table manners during a royal feast, that is, to 'put a knife to your throat' (a forceful expression for 'curb your appetite') in front of 'deceptive food' (literally, "bread of lies") because there could be an ulterior motive behind the abundant hospitality that can cause one's undoing. Verses 4–5 warn against accruing wealth as the main goal in life because riches are like a mirage: no sooner here than gone. Verses 10–11 warn against land appropriation of the defenseless people through the removal of the boundary stones (cf. 15:25; 22:28), because although there is no human 'kinsman' to defend their rights (cf. Leviticus 25:25; Ruth 4), God himself will become their redeemer (cf. 22:23). Verses 13–14 affirm the value of disciplining of children (cf. 13:24; 20:30; 22:15), as this will save them from following the paths leading to death and direct them along the path of life (cf. 13:14; 15:24). Verses 19–21 advise to avoid the company of drunkards and gluttons as excessive eating and drinking would lead to indiscipline, inertia and ultimately to poverty.

=== Verse 6 ===
Do not eat the bread of a man who is stingy; do not desire his delicacies,

- "A man who is stingy": or "a miser" (NKJV), literally, "one who has an evil eye".

== Listen to your father and mother (verses 22–35) ==
A reminder to take heed of the advice from one's father and mother precedes the warning against the seductress (verses 26–28), who is likened to a deep and narrow 'pit' (cf. Jeremiah 38:6–13; probably representing the gateway to Sheol, cf. 2:18–19; 5:5, 27; 22:14), or to a huntress who traps (cf. 7:22–23) and to a robber who lies in wait for her victims (cf. 7:12). Verses 29–35 describe the seduction of a drunkard by the power of wine which 'eye' ('sparkles' in verse 31 is literally 'gives its eye') and 'smoothness' (cf. Song of Songs 7:9) are comparable to the words of the seductress in chapters 1–9 (cf. 6:24–25). In both cases the promise of pleasure and enjoyment ('at the last', verse 32; 'in the end', 5:4) will lead to degenerative effects—both physical and mental—on its victims (verses 29, 33–35).

=== Verse 31 ===
Do not look on the wine when it is red,

When it sparkles in the cup,
When it swirls around smoothly;

- "Swirls around smoothly" (KJV: "moveth itself aright"): or "goes around smoothly"

== See also ==
- Alcohol in the Bible
- Drunkenness
- Enemy
- Envy
- Evil
- Foolishness
- Gluttony
- Knowledge
- Nephesh
- Parenting
- Poverty
- Sin
- Religion and sexuality
- Righteousness
- Soul in the Bible
- Truth
- Understanding
- Wealth
- Wickedness
- Wisdom
- YHWH
- Related Bible parts: Psalm 7, Proverbs 9, Proverbs 18, Proverbs 22, Proverbs 24, Proverbs 28

== Sources ==
- Aitken, K. T. (2007). "19. Proverbs". In Barton, John; Muddiman, John (eds.). The Oxford Bible Commentary (first (paperback) ed.). Oxford University Press. pp. 405–422. ISBN 978-0199277186.
- Alter, Robert (2010). The Wisdom Books: Job, Proverbs, and Ecclesiastes: A Translation with Commentary. W.W. Norton & Co. ISBN 978-0393080735.
- Coogan, Michael David (2007). Coogan, Michael David; Brettler, Marc Zvi; Newsom, Carol Ann; Perkins, Pheme (eds.). The New Oxford Annotated Bible with the Apocryphal/Deuterocanonical Books: New Revised Standard Version, Issue 48 (Augmented 3rd ed.). Oxford University Press. ISBN 9780195288810.
- Fox, Michael V. (2009). Proverbs 10-31: A New Translation with Introduction and Commentary. Anchor Yale Bible Commentaries. Yale University Press. ISBN 978-0300155563.
- Halley, Henry H. (1965). Halley's Bible Handbook: an abbreviated Bible commentary (24th (revised) ed.). Zondervan Publishing House. ISBN 0-310-25720-4.
- Perdue, Leo G. (2012). Proverbs Interpretation: A Bible Commentary for Teaching and Preaching. Presbyterian Publishing Corporation. ISBN 978-0664238841.
- Würthwein, Ernst (1995). The Text of the Old Testament. Translated by Rhodes, Erroll F. Grand Rapids, MI: Wm. B. Eerdmans. ISBN 0-8028-0788-7.
