= Proverbs 22 =

Twenty-second chapter of the biblical book of Proverbs

- ← chapter 21 chapter 23 →
- The whole Book of Proverbs in the Leningrad Codex (1008 C.E.) from an old facsimile edition.
- Book: Book of Proverbs
- Category: Ketuvim
- Christian Bible part: Old Testament
- Order in the Christian part: 21

Proverbs 22 is the 22nd chapter of the Book of Proverbs in the Hebrew Bible or the Old Testament of the Christian Bible. The book is a compilation of several wisdom literature collections, with the heading in 1:1 may be intended to regard Solomon as the traditional author of the whole book, but the dates of the individual collections are difficult to determine, and the book probably obtained its final shape in the post-exilic period. This chapter records parts of the second and third collection of the book.

== Text ==
=== Hebrew ===
The following table shows the Hebrew text of Proverbs 22 with vowels alongside an English translation based upon the JPS 1917 translation (now in the public domain).

Verse	Hebrew	English translation (JPS 1917)
1	נִבְחָ֣ר שֵׁ֭ם מֵעֹ֣שֶׁר רָ֑ב מִכֶּ֥סֶף וּ֝מִזָּהָ֗ב חֵ֣ן טֽוֹב׃	A good name is rather to be chosen than great riches, And loving favour rather than silver and gold.
2	עָשִׁ֣יר וָרָ֣שׁ נִפְגָּ֑שׁוּ עֹשֵׂ֖ה כֻלָּ֣ם יְהֹוָֽה׃	The rich and the poor meet together— The LORD is the maker of them all.
3	עָר֤וּם ׀ רָאָ֣ה רָעָ֣ה (ויסתר) [וְנִסְתָּ֑ר] וּ֝פְתָיִ֗ים עָבְר֥וּ וְֽנֶעֱנָֽשׁוּ׃	A prudent man seeth the evil, and hideth himself; But the thoughtless pass on, and are punished.
4	עֵ֣קֶב עֲ֭נָוָה יִרְאַ֣ת יְהֹוָ֑ה עֹ֖שֶׁר וְכָב֣וֹד וְחַיִּֽים׃	The reward of humility is the fear of the LORD, Even riches, and honour, and life.
5	צִנִּ֣ים פַּ֭חִים בְּדֶ֣רֶךְ עִקֵּ֑שׁ שׁוֹמֵ֥ר נַ֝פְשׁ֗וֹ יִרְחַ֥ק מֵהֶֽם׃	Thorns and snares are in the way of the froward; He that keepeth his soul holdeth himself far from them.
6	חֲנֹ֣ךְ לַ֭נַּעַר עַל־פִּ֣י דַרְכּ֑וֹ גַּ֥ם כִּי־יַ֝זְקִ֗ין לֹֽא־יָס֥וּר מִמֶּֽנָּה׃	Train up a child in the way he should go, And even when he is old, he will not depart from it.
7	עָ֭שִׁיר בְּרָשִׁ֣ים יִמְשׁ֑וֹל וְעֶ֥בֶד לֹ֝וֶ֗ה לְאִ֣ישׁ מַלְוֶֽה׃	The rich ruleth over the poor, And the borrower is servant to the lender.
8	זוֹרֵ֣עַ עַ֭וְלָה (יקצור) [יִקְצׇר־]אָ֑וֶן וְשֵׁ֖בֶט עֶבְרָת֣וֹ יִכְלֶֽה׃	He that soweth iniquity shall reap vanity; And the rod of his wrath shall fail.
9	טֽוֹב־עַ֭יִן ה֣וּא יְבֹרָ֑ךְ כִּֽי־נָתַ֖ן מִלַּחְמ֣וֹ לַדָּֽל׃	He that hath a bountiful eye shall be blessed; For he giveth of his bread to the poor.
10	גָּ֣רֵֽשׁ לֵ֭ץ וְיֵצֵ֣א מָד֑וֹן וְ֝יִשְׁבֹּ֗ת דִּ֣ין וְקָלֽוֹן׃	Cast out the scorner, and contention will go out; Yea, strife and shame will cease.
11	אֹהֵ֥ב (טהור) [טְהׇר־]לֵ֑ב חֵ֥ן שְׂ֝פָתָ֗יו רֵעֵ֥הוּ מֶֽלֶךְ׃	He that loveth pureness of heart, That hath grace in his lips, the king shall be his friend.
12	עֵינֵ֣י יְ֭הֹוָה נָ֣צְרוּ דָ֑עַת וַ֝יְסַלֵּ֗ף דִּבְרֵ֥י בֹגֵֽד׃	The eyes of the LORD preserve him that hath knowledge, But He overthroweth the words of the faithless man.
13	אָמַ֣ר עָ֭צֵל אֲרִ֣י בַח֑וּץ בְּת֥וֹךְ רְ֝חֹב֗וֹת אֵרָצֵֽחַ׃	The sluggard saith: ‘There is a lion without; I shall be slain in the streets.’
14	שׁוּחָ֣ה עֲ֭מֻקָּה פִּ֣י זָר֑וֹת זְע֥וּם יְ֝הֹוָ֗ה (יפול) [יִפׇּל־]שָֽׁם׃	The mouth of strange women is a deep pit: He that is abhorred of the LORD shall fall therein.
15	אִ֭וֶּלֶת קְשׁוּרָ֣ה בְלֶב־נָ֑עַר שֵׁ֥בֶט מ֝וּסָ֗ר יַרְחִיקֶ֥נָּה מִמֶּֽנּוּ׃	Foolishness is bound up in the heart of a child; But the rod of correction shall drive it far from him.
16	עֹ֣שֵֽׁק דָּ֭ל לְהַרְבּ֣וֹת ל֑וֹ נֹתֵ֥ן לְ֝עָשִׁ֗יר אַךְ־לְמַחְסֽוֹר׃	One may oppress the poor, yet will their gain increase; One may give to the rich, yet will want come.
17	הַ֥ט אׇזְנְךָ֗ וּ֭שְׁמַע דִּבְרֵ֣י חֲכָמִ֑ים וְ֝לִבְּךָ֗ תָּשִׁ֥ית לְדַעְתִּֽי׃	Incline thine ear, and hear the words of the wise, And apply thy heart unto my knowledge.
18	כִּֽי־נָ֭עִים כִּֽי־תִשְׁמְרֵ֣ם בְּבִטְנֶ֑ךָ יִכֹּ֥נוּ יַ֝חְדָּ֗ו עַל־שְׂפָתֶֽיךָ׃	For it is a pleasant thing if thou keep them within thee; Let them be established altogether upon thy lips.
19	לִֽהְי֣וֹת בַּ֭יהֹוָה מִבְטַחֶ֑ךָ הוֹדַעְתִּ֖יךָ הַיּ֣וֹם אַף־אָֽתָּה׃	That thy trust may be in the LORD, I have made them known to thee this day, even to thee.
20	הֲלֹ֤א כָתַ֣בְתִּֽי לְ֭ךָ (שלשום) [שָׁלִישִׁ֑ים] בְּמֹ֖עֵצ֣וֹת וָדָֽעַת׃	Have not I written unto thee excellent things Of counsels and knowledge;
21	לְהוֹדִֽיעֲךָ֗ קֹ֭שְׁטְ אִמְרֵ֣י אֱמֶ֑ת לְהָשִׁ֥יב אֲמָרִ֥ים אֱ֝מֶ֗ת לְשֹׁלְחֶֽיךָ׃	That I might make thee know the certainty of the words of truth, That thou mightest bring back words of truth to them that send thee?
22	אַֽל־תִּגְזׇל־דָּ֭ל כִּ֣י דַל־ה֑וּא וְאַל־תְּדַכֵּ֖א עָנִ֣י בַשָּֽׁעַר׃	Rob not the weak, because he is weak, Neither crush the poor in the gate;
23	כִּֽי־יְ֭הֹוָה יָרִ֣יב רִיבָ֑ם וְקָבַ֖ע אֶת־קֹבְעֵיהֶ֣ם נָֽפֶשׁ׃	For the LORD will plead their cause, And despoil of life those that despoil them.
24	אַל־תִּ֭תְרַע אֶת־בַּ֣עַל אָ֑ף וְאֶת־אִ֥ישׁ חֵ֝מ֗וֹת לֹ֣א תָבֽוֹא׃	Make no friendship with a man that is given to anger; And with a wrathful man thou shalt not go;
25	פֶּן־תֶּאֱלַ֥ף אֹרְחֹתָ֑ו וְלָקַחְתָּ֖ מוֹקֵ֣שׁ לְנַפְשֶֽׁךָ׃	Lest thou learn his ways, And get a snare to thy soul.
26	אַל־תְּהִ֥י בְתֹֽקְעֵי־כָ֑ף בַּ֝עֹרְבִ֗ים מַשָּׁאֽוֹת׃	Be thou not of them that strike hands, Or of them that are sureties for debts;
27	אִם־אֵֽין־לְךָ֥ לְשַׁלֵּ֑ם לָ֥מָּה יִקַּ֥ח מִ֝שְׁכָּבְךָ֗ מִתַּחְתֶּֽיךָ׃	If thou hast not wherewith to pay, Why should he take away thy bed from under thee?
28	אַל־תַּ֭סֵּג גְּב֣וּל עוֹלָ֑ם אֲשֶׁ֖ר עָשׂ֣וּ אֲבוֹתֶֽיךָ׃	Remove not the ancient landmark, Which thy fathers have set.
29	חָזִ֡יתָ אִ֤ישׁ ׀ מָ֘הִ֤יר בִּמְלַאכְתּ֗וֹ לִֽפְנֵי־מְלָכִ֥ים יִתְיַצָּ֑ב בַּל־יִ֝תְיַצֵּ֗ב לִפְנֵ֥י חֲשֻׁכִּֽים׃ {פ}	Seest thou a man diligent in his business? he shall stand before kings; He shall not stand before mean men.

=== Textual witnesses ===
Some early manuscripts containing the text of this chapter in Hebrew are of the Masoretic Text, which includes the Aleppo Codex (10th century), and Codex Leningradensis (1008).

There is also a translation into Koine Greek known as the Septuagint, made in the last few centuries BC. Extant ancient manuscripts of the Septuagint version include Codex Vaticanus (B; $\mathfrak{G}$^{B}; 4th century), Codex Sinaiticus (S; BHK: $\mathfrak{G}$^{S}; 4th century), and Codex Alexandrinus (A; $\mathfrak{G}$^{A}; 5th century).

== Analysis ==
Verse 1–16 belong to a section regarded as the second collection in the book of Proverbs (comprising Proverbs 10:1–22:16), also called "The First 'Solomonic' Collection" (the second one in Proverbs 25:1–29:27). The collection contains 375 sayings, each of which consists of two parallel phrases, except for Proverbs 19:7 which consists of three parts.

Verses 17–29 are grouped to the third collection in the book (comprising Proverbs 22:17–24:22), which consists of seven instructions of various lengths:

- 1st instruction (22:17–23:11)
- 2nd instruction (23:12–18)
- 3rd instruction (23:19–21)
- 4th instruction (23:22–25)
- 5th instruction (23:26–24:12)
- 6th instruction (24:13–20) and
- 7th instruction (24:21–22)

The sayings are predominantly in the form of synonymous parallelism, preceded by a general superscription of the entire collection in 22:17a: "The words of the wise" (or "Sayings of the Wise"). This collection consists of an introduction that the youths should be instructed and exhorted to listen to and obey their "teachers" (parents), followed by a series of admonitions and prohibitions coupled with a variety of clauses, primarily presented in short parental instructions (cf. 23:15, 22; 24:13, 21).

The 'thirty sayings' (Proverbs 22:20) in this collection are thought to be modelled on the 'thirty chapters' in Egyptian Instruction of Amen-em-ope the son of Kanakht which is dated to the Ramesside Period (ca. 1300–1075 BCE), although the parallels extend only in Proverbs 22:17–23:11 and the extent of the dependence is debated.

== Good name (22:1–16) ==
Verse 1 teaches that a name is 'an expression of the inner character and worth of its bearer' (cf. Genesis 32:28) and that it survives one's death (cf. Proverbs 10:7). Verse 2 observes that 'rich and poor' are to be found side-by-side and are equally the creatures of God (cf. Proverbs 29:13), and verse 9 urges to show generosity to the poor (cf. 14:31). Verse 6 emphasizes the importance of parental instruction in the home (cf. 19:18), with verse 15 reinforcing the value of the rod in educating children (cf. Proverbs 3:24). Verse 13 displays the inventiveness of a lazy person in making excuses for doing nothing (cf. 26:13). Verse 14 resumes the theme of 'the seductress' from the first section of the book, recalling the seductive speech of the loose woman (cf. 5:3), which, in conjunction with 'pit', may imply the entrance to the underworld (cf. Proverbs 1:12; 2:18-19; 5:5. 27).

=== Verse 1 ===
A good name is rather to be chosen than great riches,

and loving favor rather than silver and gold.

- "A good name": in Hebrew it is only "a name", but the idea of the name being "good" is implied as it has the connotation here of a reputation.
- "Loving favor": in Hebrew "favor of goodness".

== Sayings of the wise (22:17–29) ==
This section contains the first of seven sets of instruction in a collection titled "Sayings of the Wise" (22:17), with verses 17–21 as an introduction. Verses 22–23 warn against the oppression of the poor using the legal system ('at the gate') as an instrument for the exploitation (cf. Isaiah 108:1-2; Amos 5:12), because God as the protector of the poor will take up their cause (cf. Exodus 22:22–24). Verses 24–25 warn that the 'ways' of hotheads are ultimately the way of death.

=== Verses 22–23 ===
^{22}Do not rob the poor because he is poor,

neither oppress the afflicted in the gate;

^{23}for the Lord will plead their cause,

and spoil the soul of those who spoiled them.

- "Do not rob… neither oppress" presented in Hebrew using two negated jussives form: אַל־תִּגְזָל (ʾal tigzal, "do not exploit") and וְאַל־תְּדַכֵּא (veʾal tedakkeʾ, "do not crush").

== See also ==
- Charity
- Creator deity
- Diligence
- Enemy
- Envy
- Evil
- Foolishness
- Humility
- Knowledge
- Laziness
- Nephesh
- Parenting
- Poverty
- Prudence
- Reputation
- Righteousness
- Soul in the Bible
- Truth
- Understanding
- Wealth
- Wickedness
- Wisdom
- YHWH
- Related Bible parts: Psalm 1, Proverbs 9, Proverbs 18, Proverbs 23, Proverbs 24, Proverbs 28

== Sources ==
- Aitken, K. T. (2007). "19. Proverbs". In Barton, John; Muddiman, John (eds.). The Oxford Bible Commentary (first (paperback) ed.). Oxford University Press. pp. 405–422. ISBN 978-0199277186.
- Alter, Robert (2010). The Wisdom Books: Job, Proverbs, and Ecclesiastes: A Translation with Commentary. W.W. Norton & Co. ISBN 978-0393080735.
- Coogan, Michael David (2007). Coogan, Michael David; Brettler, Marc Zvi; Newsom, Carol Ann; Perkins, Pheme (eds.). The New Oxford Annotated Bible with the Apocryphal/Deuterocanonical Books: New Revised Standard Version, Issue 48 (Augmented 3rd ed.). Oxford University Press. ISBN 9780195288810.
- Farmer, Kathleen A. (1998). "The Wisdom Books". In McKenzie, Steven L.; Graham, Matt Patrick (eds.). The Hebrew Bible Today: An Introduction to Critical Issues. Westminster John Knox Press. ISBN 978-0-66425652-4.
- Fox, Michael V. (2009). Proverbs 10-31: A New Translation with Introduction and Commentary. Anchor Yale Bible Commentaries. Yale University Press. ISBN 978-0300155563.
- Halley, Henry H. (1965). Halley's Bible Handbook: an abbreviated Bible commentary (24th (revised) ed.). Zondervan Publishing House. ISBN 0-310-25720-4.
- Perdue, Leo G. (2012). Proverbs Interpretation: A Bible Commentary for Teaching and Preaching. Presbyterian Publishing Corporation. ISBN 978-0664238841.
- Würthwein, Ernst (1995). The Text of the Old Testament. Translated by Rhodes, Erroll F. Grand Rapids, MI: Wm. B. Eerdmans. ISBN 0-8028-0788-7.
