= Drug naïvety =

Lacking habituation or tolerance to pharmacological agents

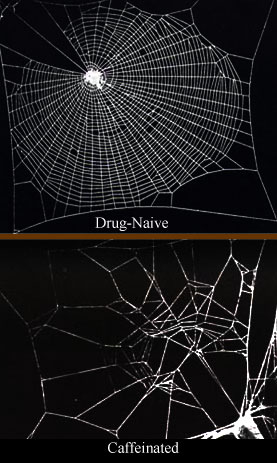
An image comparing the web of a drug-naïve spider to that of a spider having been given caffeine.

Drug naïvety is the physiological state of non-habituation or non-tolerance to either a specific drug or broader set of drugs related by pharmacological criteria. The term applies to the administration of psychotropics in contexts ranging from the professional medical treatment of patients to the non-medical abuse of any drug, as well as the veterinarian.

In addition to not being habituated, a drug-naïve person may have never received a particular drug. The same dose could be lethal for a drug-naïve person while having little effect on a heavily habituated person. In a medical context drug-naïveté is important considering medication dosage (pain medication, anxiety medication, anaesthesia, etc.), as the level of habituation affects a patient's baseline resistance to the effects of such medications.

== See also ==
- Scientific control
