= Naivety =

Lack of experience

Naivety (also spelled naïvety), naiveness, or naïveté is the state of being naive. It refers to an apparent or actual lack of experience and sophistication, often describing a neglect of pragmatism in favor of moral idealism. A naïve may be called a naïf.

== Etymology ==
In its early use, the word naïve meant "natural or innocent", and did not connote ineptitude. As a French adjective, it is spelled naïve, for feminine nouns, and naïf, for masculine nouns. As a French noun, it is spelled naïveté.

It is sometimes spelled "naïve" with a diaeresis, but as an unitalicized English word, "naive" is now the more usual spelling. "Naïf" often represents the French masculine, but has a secondary meaning as an artistic style. "Naïve" is pronounced as two syllables, in the French manner, and with the stress on the second one.

== Culture ==
The naïf appears as a cultural type in two main forms. On the one hand, there is 'the satirical naïf, such as Candide'. Northrop Frye suggested we might call it "the ingénu form, after Voltaire's dialogue of that name. "Here an outsider ... grants none of the premises which make the absurdities of society look logical to those accustomed to them", and serves essentially as a prism to carry the satirical message. Baudrillard indeed, drawing on his Situationist roots, sought to position himself as ingénu in everyday life: "I play the role of the Danube peasant: someone who knows nothing but suspects something is wrong ... I like being in the position of the primitive ... playing naïve".

On the other hand, there is the artistic "naïf - all responsiveness and seeming availability". Here 'the naïf offers himself as being in process of formation, in search of values and models...always about to adopt some traditional "mature" temperament' - in a perpetual adolescent moratorium. Such instances of "the naïf as a cultural image... offered themselves as essentially responsive to others and open to every invitation... established their identity in indeterminacy".

== See also ==
- Credulity – Willingness or ability to believe that a statement is true
- Drug naïvety – Lacking habituation or tolerance to pharmacological agents
- Friedrich Schiller – German playwright (1759–1805)
- Gullibility – Failure of social intelligence
- Naive and Sentimental Music – Symphonic work by American composer John Adams
- Naïve art – Art by a person lacking formal training
- Novice – Person or creature who is new to a field or activity
- Shoshin – Zen Buddhism concept of the beginner's mind
- The Idiot – 1868–69 novel by Fyodor Dostoyevsky
