= Foolishness =

Lack of social norms causing offence or similar effect

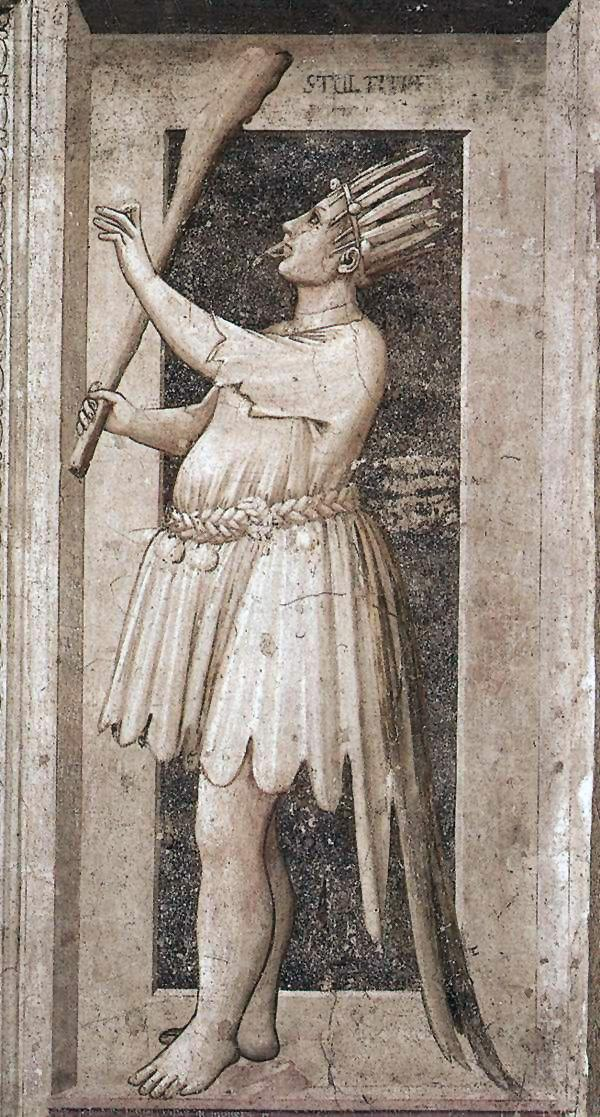
Stultitia by Giotto—from his fresco of seven virtues and their opposite vices in the Scrovegni Chapel. Stultitia (folly) was shown as the opposite of Prudentia (prudence).

Foolishness is the inability or failure to act following reason due to lack of judgment, stupidity, stubbornness, etc. The things such as impulsivity and/or influences may affect a person's ability to make reasonable decisions. Other reasons of apparent foolishness include naivety, gullibility, and credulity. Foolishness differs from stupidity, which is the lack of intelligence. An act of foolishness is called folly. A person who is foolish is called a fool. The opposite of foolishness is prudence.

== Concept ==
Andreas Maercker in 1995 defined foolishness as rigid, dogmatic, and inflexible thinking which makes feelings of bitterness and probable annoyance. It is considered the foundation of illusions of grandiosity like omniscience, omnipotence and inviolability.

Several proverbs from the Book of Proverbs characterize traits of foolishness.

== See also ==
- Folly (allegory)
- Simpleton
- Silliness
- Ridiculous
- Absurdity
- As a dog returns to his vomit, so a fool repeats his folly – Biblical proverb
- In Praise of Folly
