= Nephesh =

Hebrew word for aspects of sentience

Nephesh (Biblical Hebrew: נֶ֫פֶשׁ, romanized: nép̄eš), also spelled nefesh, is a term in the Hebrew Bible used to refer to the aspects of sentience, and human beings and other animals are both described as being nephesh. Not all living organisms are referred to as "nefesh": arthropods ("bugs") and plants, for example, are not described in the Hebrew Bible as nephesh. The English corresponding term to nephesh is the Christian term "soul," which has very similar connotations, and is customarily used to translate it.

== See also ==
- Golem § Earliest stories
- Human spirit
- Immortality
- On the Soul by Aristotle
- Pikuach nefesh
- Soul in the Bible
- Nefesh B'Nefesh

== Bibliography ==
- Horst Balz (ed.), Exegetical Dictionary of the New Testament (3 Volume Set), 1993
- A.B. Davidson, The Theology of the Old Testament, Edinburgh: T.& T. Clark, 1904/25, p.200-201
