= Soul in the Bible =

Biblical human immaterial spirit

The concept of an immaterial and immortal soul—distinct from the corporeal body—did not appear in Judaism before the Babylonian exile, instead developing as a result of interaction with Persian and Hellenistic philosophies. Accordingly, the Hebrew word נֶ֫פֶשׁ (nephesh)—though translated as "soul" in some older English-language Bibles—actually has a meaning closer to "living being". Nephesh was translated into Greek in the Septuagint as ψυχή (psūchê), using the Greek word for "soul". The New Testament also uses the word ψυχή.

The textual evidence indicates a multiplicity of perspectives on souls, including probable changes during the centuries in which the biblical corpus developed.

== Relation to Greek "psyche" ==
The only Hebrew word traditionally translated "soul" (nephesh) in English-language Bibles refers to a living, breathing conscious body, rather than to an immortal soul. In the New Testament, the Greek word traditionally translated "soul" (ψυχή) "psyche", has substantially the same meaning as the Hebrew, without reference to an immortal soul. In the Greek Septuagent psyche is used to translate each instance of nephesh.

Number of times Nephesh and Psūchê are translated into certain English words.
Translated as	Nephesh		Psūchê	
	NIV	KJV	NIV	KJV
Soul	110	475	25	58
Life	165	117	37	40
Person	25	29		
Spirit	5			
Mind	3	15	3	3
Heart	21	15	4	1
Yourselves	19	6		
Himself	18	8		
Any	11	3		
Creature	10	9		
Themselves	10	3		
Number of miscellaneous words & phrases appearing >10 to 1 times	301	53	25	1
Not Translated	47	0	8	2
TOTALS	754	753	102	105

Number of times Hebrew and Greek words are translated into certain English words.
Translated as:	ruah		neshama		leb		Kilyah		’ob		elohim		pneuma		autos		sympsychos	
	NIV	KJV	NIV	KJV	NIV	KJV	NIV	KJV	NIV	KJV	NIV	KJV	NIV	KJV	NIV	KJV	NIV	KJV
Spirit	182	232	2	2	1		1		1		1		325	317	1		1	
Spirits (angels, evil spirits)	4								16				34	42				
Soul				1														
Breath	31	27	18	17									3					
Wind	94	92											2					
Mind	6	5			28	12	4						1					
Heart	4				384	517	6						1					
Number of miscellaneous words & phrases appearing >4 to 1 times	69	22	22	4	187	64	20	31	15	17	2601; God	2606	13	21	5592 pronouns	5785		

== Genesis 2:7 ==
According to Genesis 2:7 God did not make a body and put a soul into it like a letter into an envelope of dust; rather he formed man's body from the dust, then, by breathing divine breath into it, he made the body of dust live, i.e. the dust did not embody a soul, but it became a soul – a whole creature.

=== Rabbinic understanding of Genesis 2:7 as found in the Targum ===
And the Lord God created man in two formations; and took dust from the place of the house of the sanctuary, and from the four winds of the world, and mixed from all the waters of the world, and created him red, black, and white; and breathed into his nostrils the inspiration of life, and there was in the body of Adam the inspiration of a speaking spirit, unto the illumination of the eyes and the hearing of the ears. –Targum Pseudo-Jonathan

And the Lord God created Adam from dust of the ground, and breathed upon his face the breath of lives, and it became in Adam a Discoursing Spirit. –Targum Onkelos

=== Man as nephesh ===
The LORD God formed man of the dust of the ground^{[adamah]}, and breathed into his nostrils the breath of life^{[nishmat ḥayim]}; and man became a living soul^{[lenephesh ayyah]}.

— Genesis 2:7 (with notes added)

Here and "all through Scripture" a "living soul" denotes a "living person". This is because, as Brevard Childs writes, in the biblical view, a person "does not have a soul, but is a soul".

=== Animals as nephesh ===
And out of the ground the LORD God formed every beast of the field, and every fowl of the air; and brought them unto Adam to see what he would call them: and whatsoever Adam called every living^{[chay]} creature,^{[nephesh]} that was the name thereof.

— Genesis 2:19 (with notes added)

In 1 Corinthians 15:45 (KJV), soul [psūchê] is defined based on an interpretation of Old Testament text; “And so it is written, The first man Adam was made a living soul^{[psūchê]}; the last Adam was made a quickening spirit.”(1 Corinthians 15:45)

== New Testament ==
The New Testament counterpart to the Old Testament word for soul, nephesh, is psyche. The two words carry a similar range of meanings. Both can designate the person or the person’s life as a whole. For all uses and meanings of psyche/ψυχἠ, see Joseph Henry Thayer, A Greek-English Lexicon of the New Testament.

== Death of the soul ==
According to some writers, nephesh and psūchê are not naturally immortal. They die and are uncomprehending during the time between death and Judgment Day resurrection, also known as the intermediate state.

John Goldingay writes, "The life of a human being came more directly from God, and it is also evident that when someone dies, the breath (rûaḥ, e.g., Ps 104:29) or the life (nepeš, e.g., Gen 35:18) disappears and returns to the God who is rûaḥ."

== Immortality ==
The concept of an immaterial soul separate from and surviving the body is common today but according to modern scholars, it was not found in ancient Hebrew beliefs. The word nephesh never means an immortal soul or an incorporeal part of the human being that can survive death of the body as the spirit of the dead.

=== Traditional Christianity ===
In Patristic thought, towards the end of the 2nd century, psūchê had begun to be understood in a more Greek than a Hebrew way, contrasted with the body. By the 3rd century, with the influence of Origen, the traditions of the inherent immortality of the soul and its divine nature were established. As the new Encyclopædia Britannica points out: “The early Christian philosophers adopted the Greek concept of the soul’s immortality and thought of the soul as being created by God and infused into the body at conception.” Inherent immortality of the soul was accepted among western and eastern theologians throughout the Middle Ages, and after the Reformation, as evidenced by the Westminster Confession.

=== Modern scholarship ===
The scholarly consensus of the 20th century held that the canonical teaching of the Old Testament made no reference to an immortal soul independent of the body in at least its earlier periods. A wide range of scholarly reference works consistently represent this view. In recent times, an increasing number of scholars have dissented from this view. According to Stephen Cook, scholars "now hotly debate the older, commonplace position that the idea of a soul, separable from the body, played little or no role in preexilic Israel" and that "recent approaches to Israelite religion that are increasingly informed by archaeological artifacts are defending the view that Israel’s beliefs in an afterlife were much more vibrant than many scholars have been willing to admit." Christopher Hays also concurs.

Many modern theologians reject the view that the Bible teaches the doctrine of the immortal soul, and Hebblethwaite claims the doctrine is "not popular amongst Christian theologians or among Christian philosophers today".
