= Proverbs 4 =

Fourth chapter of the biblical book of Proverbs

- ← chapter 3 chapter 5 →
- The whole Book of Proverbs in the Leningrad Codex (1008 C.E.) from an old facsimile edition.
- Book: Book of Proverbs
- Category: Ketuvim
- Christian Bible part: Old Testament
- Order in the Christian part: 21

Proverbs 4 is the fourth chapter of the Book of Proverbs in the Hebrew Bible or the Old Testament of the Christian Bible. The book is a compilation of several wisdom literature collections, with the heading in 1:1 may be intended to regard Solomon as the traditional author of the whole book, but the dates of the individual collections are difficult to determine, and the book probably obtained its final shape in the post-exilic period. This chapter is a part of the first collection of the book. The Jerusalem Bible entitles this chapter, "On choosing wisdom".

== Text ==
=== Hebrew ===
The following table shows the Hebrew text of Proverbs 4 with vowels alongside an English translation based upon the JPS 1917 translation (now in the public domain).

Verse	Hebrew	English translation (JPS 1917)
1	שִׁמְע֣וּ בָ֭נִים מ֣וּסַר אָ֑ב וְ֝הַקְשִׁ֗יבוּ לָדַ֥עַת בִּינָֽה׃	Hear, ye children, the instruction of a father, And attend to know understanding.
2	כִּ֤י לֶ֣קַח ט֭וֹב נָתַ֣תִּי לָכֶ֑ם תּ֝וֹרָתִ֗י אַֽל־תַּעֲזֹֽבוּ׃	For I give you a good taking; Forsake ye not my teaching.
3	כִּֽי־בֵ֭ן הָיִ֣יתִי לְאָבִ֑י רַ֥ךְ וְ֝יָחִ֗יד לִפְנֵ֥י אִמִּֽי׃	For I was a son unto my father, Tender and an only one in front of my mother.
4	וַיֹּרֵ֗נִי וַיֹּ֥אמֶר לִ֗י יִֽתְמׇךְ־דְּבָרַ֥י לִבֶּ֑ךָ שְׁמֹ֖ר מִצְוֺתַ֣י וֶחְיֵֽה׃	And he taught me, and said unto me: ‘Let thy heart hold fast my words, Keep my commandments, and live;
5	קְנֵ֣ה חׇ֭כְמָה קְנֵ֣ה בִינָ֑ה אַל־תִּשְׁכַּ֥ח וְאַל־תֵּ֝֗ט מֵאִמְרֵי־פִֽי׃	Get wisdom, get understanding; Forget not, neither decline from the words of my mouth;
6	אַל־תַּעַזְבֶ֥הָ וְתִשְׁמְרֶ֑ךָּ אֱהָבֶ֥הָ וְתִצְּרֶֽךָּ׃	Forsake her not, and she will preserve thee; Love her, and she will keep thee.
7	רֵאשִׁ֣ית חׇ֭כְמָה קְנֵ֣ה חׇכְמָ֑ה וּבְכׇל־קִ֝נְיָנְךָ֗ קְנֵ֣ה בִינָֽה׃	The beginning of wisdom is: Get wisdom; Yea, with all thy getting get understanding.
8	סַלְסְלֶ֥הָ וּֽתְרוֹמְמֶ֑ךָּ תְּ֝כַבֵּ֗דְךָ כִּ֣י תְחַבְּקֶֽנָּה׃	Extol her, and she will exalt thee; She will bring thee to honour, when thou dost embrace her.
9	תִּתֵּ֣ן לְ֭רֹאשְׁךָ לִוְיַת־חֵ֑ן עֲטֶ֖רֶת תִּפְאֶ֣רֶת תְּמַגְּנֶֽךָּ׃	She will give to thy head a chaplet of grace; A crown of glory will she bestow on thee.’
10	שְׁמַ֣ע בְּ֭נִי וְקַ֣ח אֲמָרָ֑י וְיִרְבּ֥וּ לְ֝ךָ֗ שְׁנ֣וֹת חַיִּֽים׃	Hear, O my son, and receive my sayings; And the years of thy life shall be many.
11	בְּדֶ֣רֶךְ חׇ֭כְמָה הֹרֵיתִ֑יךָ הִ֝דְרַכְתִּ֗יךָ בְּמַעְגְּלֵי־יֹֽשֶׁר׃	I have taught thee in the way of wisdom; I have led thee in paths of uprightness.
12	בְּֽ֭לֶכְתְּךָ לֹא־יֵצַ֣ר צַעֲדֶ֑ךָ וְאִם־תָּ֝ר֗וּץ לֹ֣א תִכָּשֵֽׁל׃	When thou goest, thy step shall not be straitened; And if thou runnest, thou shalt not stumble.
13	הַחֲזֵ֣ק בַּמּוּסָ֣ר אַל־תֶּ֑רֶף נִ֝צְּרֶ֗הָ כִּי־הִ֥יא חַיֶּֽיךָ׃	Take fast hold of instruction, let her not go; Keep her, for she is thy life.
14	בְּאֹ֣רַח רְ֭שָׁעִים אַל־תָּבֹ֑א וְאַל־תְּ֝אַשֵּׁ֗ר בְּדֶ֣רֶךְ רָעִֽים׃	Enter not into the path of the wicked, And walk not in the way of evil men.
15	פְּרָעֵ֥הוּ אַל־תַּעֲבׇר־בּ֑וֹ שְׂטֵ֖ה מֵעָלָ֣יו וַעֲבֹֽר׃	Avoid it, pass not by it; Turn from it, and pass on.
16	כִּ֤י לֹ֣א יִֽ֭שְׁנוּ אִם־לֹ֣א יָרֵ֑עוּ וְֽנִגְזְלָ֥ה שְׁ֝נָתָ֗ם אִם־לֹ֥א (יכשולו) [יַכְשִֽׁילוּ]׃	For they sleep not, except they have done evil; And their sleep is taken away, unless they cause some to fall.
17	כִּ֣י לָ֭חֲמוּ לֶ֣חֶם רֶ֑שַׁע וְיֵ֖ין חֲמָסִ֣ים יִשְׁתּֽוּ׃	For they eat the bread of wickedness, And drink the wine of violence.
18	וְאֹ֣רַח צַ֭דִּיקִים כְּא֣וֹר נֹ֑גַהּ הוֹלֵ֥ךְ וָ֝א֗וֹר עַד־נְכ֥וֹן הַיּֽוֹם׃	But the path of the righteous is as the light of dawn, That shineth more and more unto the perfect day.
19	דֶּ֣רֶךְ רְ֭שָׁעִים כָּאֲפֵלָ֑ה לֹ֥א יָ֝דְע֗וּ בַּמֶּ֥ה יִכָּשֵֽׁלוּ׃	The way of the wicked is as darkness; They know not at what they stumble.
20	בְּ֭נִי לִדְבָרַ֣י הַקְשִׁ֑יבָה לַ֝אֲמָרַ֗י הַט־אׇזְנֶֽךָ׃	My son, attend to my words; Incline thine ear unto my sayings.
21	אַל־יַלִּ֥יזוּ מֵעֵינֶ֑יךָ שׇׁ֝מְרֵ֗ם בְּת֣וֹךְ לְבָבֶֽךָ׃	Let them not depart from thine eyes; Keep them in the midst of thy heart.
22	כִּֽי־חַיִּ֣ים הֵ֭ם לְמֹצְאֵיהֶ֑ם וּֽלְכׇל־בְּשָׂר֥וֹ מַרְפֵּֽא׃	For they are life unto those that find them, And health to all their flesh.
23	מִֽכׇּל־מִ֭שְׁמָר נְצֹ֣ר לִבֶּ֑ךָ כִּֽי־מִ֝מֶּ֗נּוּ תּוֹצְא֥וֹת חַיִּֽים׃	Above all that thou guardest keep thy heart; For out of it are the issues of life.
24	הָסֵ֣ר מִ֭מְּךָ עִקְּשׁ֣וּת פֶּ֑ה וּלְז֥וּת שְׂ֝פָתַ֗יִם הַרְחֵ֥ק מִמֶּֽךָּ׃	Put away from thee a froward mouth, And perverse lips put far from thee.
25	עֵ֭ינֶיךָ לְנֹ֣כַח יַבִּ֑יטוּ וְ֝עַפְעַפֶּ֗יךָ יַיְשִׁ֥רוּ נֶגְדֶּֽךָ׃	Let thine eyes look right on, And let thine eyelids look straight before thee.
26	פַּ֭לֵּס מַעְגַּ֣ל רַגְלֶ֑ךָ וְֽכׇל־דְּרָכֶ֥יךָ יִכֹּֽנוּ׃	Make plain the path of thy feet, And let all thy ways be established.
27	אַֽל־תֵּט־יָמִ֥ין וּשְׂמֹ֑אול הָסֵ֖ר רַגְלְךָ֣ מֵרָֽע׃	Turn not to the right hand nor to the left; Remove thy foot from evil.

=== Textual witnesses ===
Some early manuscripts containing the text of this chapter in Hebrew are of the Masoretic Text, which includes the Aleppo Codex (10th century), and Codex Leningradensis (1008).

There is also a translation into Koine Greek known as the Septuagint, made in the last few centuries BC; some extant ancient manuscripts of this version include Codex Vaticanus (B; $\mathfrak{G}$^{B}; 4th century), Codex Sinaiticus (S; BHK: $\mathfrak{G}$^{S}; 4th century), and Codex Alexandrinus (A; $\mathfrak{G}$^{A}; 5th century).

== Analysis ==
This chapter belongs to a section regarded as the first collection in the book of Proverbs (comprising Proverbs 1–9), known as "Didactic discourses". The Jerusalem Bible describes chapters 1–9 as a prologue of the chapters 10–22:16, the so-called "[actual] proverbs of Solomon", as "the body of the book".

This chapter has the following structure:

- an exhortation to acquire wisdom (verses 1–4a),
- a list of the benefits of wisdom (4b–9),
- a call to pursue a righteous lifestyle (10–13),
- a warning against a wicked lifestyle (14–19), and
- an exhortation to righteousness (20–27).

== Get Wisdom! (4:1–9) ==
This passage focuses on the value of Wisdom, so it needs to be acquired at all costs (verse 7). The father's appeal (verses 1–2) is reinforced by recounting his own experience when he was taught the lesson by his own parents (verses 3–4), demonstrating the importance of a "home" as the place for an educational discipline to get Wisdom (cf. Exodus 12:26–27; Deuteronomy 6:6–7, 20–25), and the transmission from one generation to the next. In verses 6–9 Wisdom is personified as 'a bride to be wooed', and who, in return, will 'love and honor those who embrace her', in contrast to the spurious love and deadly embrace of the seductress.

=== Verse 1 ===
Hear, O children, the instruction of a father,

and attend to know understanding.

- "Know": in Hebrew literally "in order to come to know", from the interpretation of the stative verb יָדַע, yadaʿ, which can also mean "to learn."

== The right way and the wrong way (4:10–27) ==
The metaphor of a road with two ways in one's life is important in the teaching of Proverbs, even if it occurs many times (cf. Proverbs 1:15,19; 2:8–22; 3:17, 23, etc.), in counseling young people to avoid the path of the wicked, but to stay on the way of wisdom ("paths of uprightness" that is "straight and level"; cf. Proverbs 3:6), which is the good path (cf. Proverbs 2:9) and also the secure path (cf. Proverbs 3:23) without fear of stumbling (verse 12; cf. Psalm 18:36), brightly illuminated (verse 18; steadily increasing brightness from the first flickers of dawn to the full splendor of the noonday sun). On the other hand, the way of the wicked, with evil activities (Proverbs 1:18-19) and twisted paths (Proverbs 2:12–15), is shrouded in 'deep darkness' (verse 19; the same term is used the plague of darkness in Egypt in Exodus 10:22, or as the consequences of the day of the Lord in Joel 2:2; Amos 5:20, etc.), which hinders those who walk on it to even see what their feet strike on the final, fatal step (cf. Job 18:7–12; Jeremiah 13:16; 23:12). The appeal to accept the father's words (verse 10) resumes in the final paragraph (verses 20–27) because they are 'life' and 'healing' (verse 22; cf. Proverbs 3:8).

== See also ==
- Blessing
- Divine judgment
- Evil
- Hubris
- Pride
- Righteousness
- Sheol
- Sin
- Soul
- Truth
- Understanding
- Wickedness
- Wisdom
- YHWH
- Related Bible parts: Proverbs 1, Proverbs 2, Proverbs 7, Proverbs 9

== Sources ==
- Aitken, K. T. (2007). "19. Proverbs". In Barton, John; Muddiman, John (eds.). The Oxford Bible Commentary (first (paperback) ed.). Oxford University Press. pp. 405–422. ISBN 978-0199277186.
- Alter, Robert (2010). The Wisdom Books: Job, Proverbs, and Ecclesiastes: A Translation with Commentary. W.W. Norton & Co. ISBN 978-0393080735.
- Coogan, Michael David (2007). Coogan, Michael David; Brettler, Marc Zvi; Newsom, Carol Ann; Perkins, Pheme (eds.). The New Oxford Annotated Bible with the Apocryphal/Deuterocanonical Books: New Revised Standard Version, Issue 48 (Augmented 3rd ed.). Oxford University Press. ISBN 9780195288810.
- Farmer, Kathleen A. (1998). "The Wisdom Books". In McKenzie, Steven L.; Graham, Matt Patrick (eds.). The Hebrew Bible Today: An Introduction to Critical Issues. Westminster John Knox Press. ISBN 978-0-66425652-4.
- Fox, Michael V. (2009). Proverbs 10-31: A New Translation with Introduction and Commentary. Anchor Yale Bible Commentaries. Yale University Press. ISBN 978-0300155563.
- Halley, Henry H. (1965). Halley's Bible Handbook: an abbreviated Bible commentary (24th (revised) ed.). Zondervan Publishing House. ISBN 0-310-25720-4.
- Perdue, Leo G. (2012). Proverbs Interpretation: A Bible Commentary for Teaching and Preaching. Presbyterian Publishing Corporation. ISBN 978-0664238841.
- Würthwein, Ernst (1995). The Text of the Old Testament. Translated by Rhodes, Erroll F. Grand Rapids, MI: Wm. B. Eerdmans. ISBN 0-8028-0788-7.
