= Proverbs 6 =

Sixth chapter of the biblical book of Proverbs

- ← chapter 5 chapter 7 →
- The whole Book of Proverbs in the Leningrad Codex (1008 C.E.) from an old facsimile edition.
- Book: Book of Proverbs
- Category: Ketuvim
- Christian Bible part: Old Testament
- Order in the Christian part: 21

Proverbs 6 is the sixth chapter of the Book of Proverbs in the Hebrew Bible or the Old Testament of the Christian Bible. The book is a compilation of several wisdom literature collections, with the heading in 1:1 may be intended to regard Solomon as the traditional author of the whole book, but the dates of the individual collections are difficult to determine, and the book probably obtained its final shape in the post-exilic period. This chapter is a part of the first collection of the book.

== Text ==
=== Hebrew ===
The following table shows the Hebrew text of Proverbs 6 with vowels alongside an English translation based upon the JPS 1917 translation (now in the public domain).

Verse	Hebrew	English translation (JPS 1917)
1	בְּ֭נִי אִם־עָרַ֣בְתָּ לְרֵעֶ֑ךָ תָּקַ֖עְתָּ לַזָּ֣ר כַּפֶּֽיךָ׃	My son, if thou art become surety for thy neighbour, If thou hast struck thy hands for a stranger—
2	נוֹקַ֥שְׁתָּ בְאִמְרֵי־פִ֑יךָ נִ֝לְכַּ֗דְתָּ בְּאִמְרֵי־פִֽיךָ׃	Thou art snared by the words of thy mouth, Thou art caught by the words of thy mouth—
3	עֲשֵׂ֨ה זֹ֥את אֵפ֪וֹא ׀ בְּנִ֡י וְֽהִנָּצֵ֗ל כִּ֘י בָ֤אתָ בְכַף־רֵעֶ֑ךָ לֵ֥ךְ הִ֝תְרַפֵּ֗ס וּרְהַ֥ב רֵעֶֽיךָ׃	Do this now, my son, and deliver thyself, Seeing thou art come into the hand of thy neighbour; Go, humble thyself, and urge thy neighbour.
4	אַל־תִּתֵּ֣ן שֵׁנָ֣ה לְעֵינֶ֑יךָ וּ֝תְנוּמָ֗ה לְעַפְעַפֶּֽיךָ׃	Give not sleep to thine eyes, nor slumber to thine eyelids.
5	הִ֭נָּצֵל כִּצְבִ֣י מִיָּ֑ד וּ֝כְצִפּ֗וֹר מִיַּ֥ד יָקֽוּשׁ׃	Deliver thyself as a gazelle from the hand [of the hunter], And as a bird from the hand of the fowler.
6	לֵֽךְ־אֶל־נְמָלָ֥ה עָצֵ֑ל רְאֵ֖ה דְרָכֶ֣יהָ וַחֲכָֽם׃	Go to the ant, thou sluggard; Consider her ways, and be wise;
7	אֲשֶׁ֖ר אֵֽין־לָ֥הּ קָצִ֗ין שֹׁטֵ֥ר וּמֹשֵֽׁל׃	Which having no chief, Overseer, or ruler,
8	תָּכִ֣ין בַּקַּ֣יִץ לַחְמָ֑הּ אָגְרָ֥ה בַ֝קָּצִ֗יר מַֽאֲכָלָֽהּ׃	Provideth her bread in the summer, And gatherest her food in the harvest.
9	עַד־מָתַ֖י עָצֵ֥ל ׀ תִּשְׁכָּ֑ב מָ֝תַ֗י תָּק֥וּם מִשְּׁנָתֶֽךָ׃	How long wilt thou sleep, O sluggard? When wilt thou arise out of thy sleep?
10	מְעַ֣ט שֵׁ֭נוֹת מְעַ֣ט תְּנוּמ֑וֹת מְעַ֓ט ׀ חִבֻּ֖ק יָדַ֣יִם לִשְׁכָּֽב׃	’Yet a little sleep, a little slumber, A little folding of the hands to sleep’—
11	וּבָֽא־כִמְהַלֵּ֥ךְ רֵאשֶׁ֑ךָ וּ֝מַחְסֹרְךָ֗ כְּאִ֣ישׁ מָגֵֽן׃	So shall thy poverty come as a runner, And thy want as an armed man.
12	אָדָ֣ם בְּ֭לִיַּעַל אִ֣ישׁ אָ֑וֶן ה֝וֹלֵ֗ךְ עִקְּשׁ֥וּת פֶּֽה׃	A base person, a man of iniquity, Is he that walketh with a froward mouth; .
13	קֹרֵ֣ץ בְּ֭עֵינָו מֹלֵ֣ל בְּרַגְלָ֑ו מֹ֝רֶ֗ה בְּאֶצְבְּעֹתָֽיו׃	That winketh with his eyes, that scrapeth with his feet, That pointeth with his fingers;
14	תַּ֥הְפֻּכ֨וֹת ׀ בְּלִבּ֗וֹ חֹרֵ֣שׁ רָ֣ע בְּכׇל־עֵ֑ת (מדנים) [מִדְיָנִ֥ים] יְשַׁלֵּֽחַ׃	Frowardness is in his heart, he deviseth evil continually; He soweth discord.
15	עַל־כֵּ֗ן פִּ֭תְאֹם יָב֣וֹא אֵיד֑וֹ פֶּ֥תַע יִ֝שָּׁבֵ֗ר וְאֵ֣ין מַרְפֵּֽא׃	Therefore, shall his calamity come suddenly; On a sudden shall he be broken, and that without remedy.
16	שֶׁשׁ־הֵ֭נָּה שָׂנֵ֣א יְהֹוָ֑ה וְ֝שֶׁ֗בַע (תועבות) [תּוֹעֲבַ֥ת] נַפְשֽׁוֹ׃	There are six things which the LORD hateth, Yea, seven which are an abomination unto Him:
17	עֵינַ֣יִם רָ֭מוֹת לְשׁ֣וֹן שָׁ֑קֶר וְ֝יָדַ֗יִם שֹׁפְכ֥וֹת דָּם־נָקִֽי׃	Haughty eyes, a lying tongue, And hands that shed innocent blood;
18	לֵ֗ב חֹ֭רֵשׁ מַחְשְׁב֣וֹת אָ֑וֶן רַגְלַ֥יִם מְ֝מַהֲר֗וֹת לָר֥וּץ לָֽרָעָֽה׃	A heart that deviseth wicked thoughts, Feet that are swift in running to evil;
19	יָפִ֣יחַ כְּ֭זָבִים עֵ֣ד שָׁ֑קֶר וּמְשַׁלֵּ֥חַ מְ֝דָנִ֗ים בֵּ֣ין אַחִֽים׃	A false witness that breatheth out lies, And he that soweth discord among brethren.
20	נְצֹ֣ר בְּ֭נִי מִצְוַ֣ת אָבִ֑יךָ וְאַל־תִּ֝טֹּ֗שׁ תּוֹרַ֥ת אִמֶּֽךָ׃	My son, keep the commandment of thy father, And forsake not the teaching of thy mother;
21	קׇשְׁרֵ֣ם עַל־לִבְּךָ֣ תָמִ֑יד עׇ֝נְדֵ֗ם עַל־גַּרְגְּרֹתֶֽךָ׃	Bind them continually upon thy heart, Tie them about thy neck.
22	בְּהִתְהַלֶּכְךָ֨ ׀ תַּנְחֶ֬ה אֹתָ֗ךְ בְּֽ֭שׇׁכְבְּךָ תִּשְׁמֹ֣ר עָלֶ֑יךָ וַ֝הֲקִיצ֗וֹתָ הִ֣יא תְשִׂיחֶֽךָ׃	When thou walkest, it shall lead thee, When thou liest down, it shall watch over thee; And when thou awakest, it shall talk with thee.
23	כִּ֤י נֵ֣ר מִ֭צְוָה וְת֣וֹרָה א֑וֹר וְדֶ֥רֶךְ חַ֝יִּ֗ים תּוֹכְח֥וֹת מוּסָֽר׃	For the commandment is a lamp, and the teaching is light, And reproofs of instruction are the way of life;
24	לִ֭שְׁמׇרְךָ מֵאֵ֣שֶׁת רָ֑ע מֵ֝חֶלְקַ֗ת לָשׁ֥וֹן נׇכְרִיָּֽה׃	To keep thee from the evil woman, From the smoothness of the alien tongue.
25	אַל־תַּחְמֹ֣ד יׇ֭פְיָהּ בִּלְבָבֶ֑ךָ וְאַל־תִּ֝קָּחֲךָ֗ בְּעַפְעַפֶּֽיהָ׃	Lust not after her beauty in thy heart; Neither let her captivate thee with her eyelids.
26	כִּ֤י בְעַד־אִשָּׁ֥ה זוֹנָ֗ה עַֽד־כִּכַּ֫ר־לָ֥חֶם וְאֵ֥שֶׁת אִ֑ישׁ נֶ֖פֶשׁ יְקָרָ֣ה תָצֽוּד׃	For on account of a harlot a man is brought to a loaf of bread, But the adulteress hunteth for the precious life.
27	הֲיַחְתֶּ֤ה אִ֓ישׁ אֵ֬שׁ בְּחֵיק֑וֹ וּ֝בְגָדָ֗יו לֹ֣א תִשָּׂרַֽפְנָה׃	Can a man take fire in his bosom, And his clothes not be burned?
28	אִם־יְהַלֵּ֣ךְ אִ֭ישׁ עַל־הַגֶּחָלִ֑ים וְ֝רַגְלָ֗יו לֹ֣א תִכָּוֶֽינָה׃	Or can one walk upon hot coals, And his feet not be scorched?
29	כֵּ֗ן הַ֭בָּא אֶל־אֵ֣שֶׁת רֵעֵ֑הוּ לֹ֥א יִ֝נָּקֶ֗ה כׇּֽל־הַנֹּגֵ֥עַ בָּֽהּ׃	So he that goeth in to his neighbour's wife; Whosoever toucheth her shall not go unpunished.
30	לֹא־יָב֣וּזוּ לַ֭גַּנָּב כִּ֣י יִגְנ֑וֹב לְמַלֵּ֥א נַ֝פְשׁ֗וֹ כִּ֣י יִרְעָֽב׃	Men do not despise a thief, if he steal To satisfy his soul when he is hungry;
31	וְ֭נִמְצָא יְשַׁלֵּ֣ם שִׁבְעָתָ֑יִם אֶת־כׇּל־ה֖וֹן בֵּית֣וֹ יִתֵּֽן׃	But if he be found, he must restore sevenfold, He must give all the substance of his house.
32	נֹאֵ֣ף אִשָּׁ֣ה חֲסַר־לֵ֑ב מַֽשְׁחִ֥ית נַ֝פְשׁ֗וֹ ה֣וּא יַעֲשֶֽׂנָּה׃	He that committeth adultery with a woman lacketh understanding; He doeth it that would destroy his own soul.
33	נֶגַע־וְקָל֥וֹן יִמְצָ֑א וְ֝חֶרְפָּת֗וֹ לֹ֣א תִמָּחֶֽה׃	Wounds and dishonour shall he get, And his reproach shall not be wiped away. .
34	כִּֽי־קִנְאָ֥ה חֲמַת־גָּ֑בֶר וְלֹא־יַ֝חְמ֗וֹל בְּי֣וֹם נָקָֽם׃	For jealousy is the rage of a man, And he will not spare in the day of vengeance.
35	לֹֽא־יִ֭שָּׂא פְּנֵ֣י כׇל־כֹּ֑פֶר וְלֹֽא־יֹ֝אבֶ֗ה כִּ֣י תַרְבֶּה־שֹּֽׁחַד׃	He will not regard any ransom; Neither will he rest content, though thou givest many gifts.

=== Textual witnesses ===
Some early manuscripts containing the text of this chapter in Hebrew are of the Masoretic Text, which includes the Aleppo Codex (10th century), and Codex Leningradensis (1008).

There is also a translation into Koine Greek known as the Septuagint, made in the last few centuries BC; some extant ancient manuscripts of this version include Codex Vaticanus (B; $\mathfrak{G}$^{B}; 4th century), Codex Sinaiticus (S; BHK: $\mathfrak{G}$^{S}; 4th century), and Codex Alexandrinus (A; $\mathfrak{G}$^{A}; 5th century).

== Analysis ==
This chapter belongs to a section regarded as the first collection in the book of Proverbs (comprising Proverbs 1–9), known as "Didactic discourses". The Jerusalem Bible describes chapters 1–9 as a prologue of the chapters 10–22:16, the so-called "[actual] proverbs of Solomon", as "the body of the book".

The structure of chapter involves some advices:

1. Advises release from foolish indebtedness (1–5)
2. Admonishes avoiding laziness (6–8)
3. Warns of the danger of poverty (9–11) and deviousness (12–15),
4. Lists conduct that the Lord hates (16–19)
5. Warns about immorality (20–35).

The New King James Version entitles the chapters and sections as follows:

- Dangerous Promises (verses 1–5)
- The Folly of Indolence (verses 6–11)
- The Wicked Man (verses 12–19)
- Beware of Adultery (verses 20–35)

== Four warnings (6:1–19) ==
This section contains four miscellaneous sayings which are more reminiscent of the proverbial sayings in chapters 10–31 than the instructions in chapters 1–9:

1. Warning against acting as guarantor for debts (verses 1–5)
2. Warning against laziness and encourage diligence (verses 6–11)
3. Warning of the danger of scoundrel (verses 12–15)
4. Warnings of things that the Lord hates (verses 16–19)

Verses 16–19 contain a graded numerical saying (cf. Proverbs 30:15–31; Job 5:19; Amos 1:3–2:8) that is particularly useful both as a means of classification and as an aid to memorization. The saying lists 'different kinds of malicious and disruptive activity through a review of the unhealthy body': 'eyes... tongue... hands... heart... feet' (cf. Proverbs 4:23–27), with the addition of 'false witness' and 'one who stirs up strife' to make up the seven vices.

=== Verse 1 ===
My son, if you become surety for your friend,
If you have shaken hands in pledge for a stranger,

- "Surety": or "guaranty", "collateral" There are several references to suretyship in Proverbs, the first coming here (verses 1–6). According to Perowne,
  the strong terms of warning and reprobation in which it is invariably spoken of… accord well with what we should suppose to be the condition of society in the reign of Solomon. In earlier and simpler times it was enough for the Law to forbid usury or interest for a loan of money to be exacted by one Israelite of another; and raiment given as a pledge or security for a debt was to be returned before night-fall to be the owner’s covering in his sleep (Exodus 22:25–27; Leviticus 25:35–38). With the development, however, of commerce and the growth of luxury under Solomon, money-lending transactions, whether for speculation in trade, or for personal gratification, had come to be among the grave dangers that beset the path of youth.
  Accordingly, the writer of Proverbs "has no quarter for it, but condemns it unsparingly on every mention of it". Subsequent references to surety are at Proverbs 11:15, 17:18, 20:16, 22:26 and 27:13.
- "Shaken": in Hebrew literally "struck" as in "struck hands in pledge" (NIV), that is, a handshake signaling the guarantee of a pledge (such as Proverbs 11:15; 17:18; 2 2:26, 2 Kings 10:15). An unwise guarantor would be threatened with not only 'penury' (cf. Proverbs 22:26–27) but also slavery (cf. 2 Kings 4:1–7; Nehemiah 5:1–8).

== The price of adultery (6:20–35) ==
This passage focuses on the instruction to protect against the enticements of the seductress, in particular here of "a married woman". An affair with the adulteress would exact a heavy price, 'a man's very life', as a jealous and enraged husband would seek revenge and demand a higher price than money (verses 34–35).

=== Verse 21 ===
Bind them continually upon your heart,

and tie them around your neck.

- "Bind them": an allusion to Deuteronomy 6:6–8 (cf. Proverbs 3:3, 24) where the people of Israel were told to bind a copy of the law on their foreheads and arms.

=== Verse 22 ===
When you walk, their counsel will lead you.

When you sleep, they will protect you.
When you wake up, they will advise you.

=== Verse 23 ===
For like a lamp is a commandment, and instruction is light,
and the way of life[a] is the reproof of discipline,

=== Verse 24 ===
They will protect you
from the flattering words
of someone else's wife.

=== Verse 25 ===
Don’t hunger in your heart after her beauty.
Don’t let her eyes capture you.

=== Verse 26 ===
For the price of a woman, a prostitute,[a] is the price of a loaf of bread,
but the woman belonging to a man[b] hunts precious life.

=== Verse 27 ===
Can a man carry fire in his lap
without burning his clothes?

=== Verse 28 ===
Or can one walk on hot coals
and his feet not be scorched?

=== Verse 29 ===
It is just as dangerous to sleep with another man's wife. Whoever does it will suffer.

== See also ==
- Blessing
- Divine judgment
- Evil
- Hubris
- Pride
- Righteousness
- Sexual ethics
- Sheol
- Sin
- Soul
- Truth
- Understanding
- Wickedness
- Wisdom
- YHWH
- Related Bible parts: Proverbs 1, Proverbs 2, Proverbs 7, Proverbs 9

== Sources ==
- Aitken, K. T. (2007). "19. Proverbs". In Barton, John; Muddiman, John (eds.). The Oxford Bible Commentary (1st paperback ed.). Oxford University Press. pp. 405–22. ISBN 978-0-19927718-6.
- Alter, Robert (2010). The Wisdom Books: Job, Proverbs, and Ecclesiastes: A Translation with Commentary. W.W. Norton & Co. ISBN 978-0-39308073-5.
- Coogan, Michael David (2007). Coogan, Michael David; Brettler, Marc Zvi; Newsom, Carol Ann; Perkins, Pheme (eds.). The New Oxford Annotated Bible with the Apocryphal/Deuterocanonical Books: New Revised Standard Version, Issue 48 (Augmented 3rd ed.). Oxford University Press. ISBN 978-0-19528881-0.
- Farmer, Kathleen A. (1998). "The Wisdom Books". In McKenzie, Steven L.; Graham, Matt Patrick (eds.). The Hebrew Bible Today: An Introduction to Critical Issues. Westminster John Knox Press. ISBN 978-0-66425652-4.
- Fox, Michael V. (2009). Proverbs 10-31: A New Translation with Introduction and Commentary. Anchor Yale Bible Commentaries. Yale University Press. ISBN 978-0-30015556-3.
- Halley, Henry H. (1965). Halley's Bible Handbook: an abbreviated Bible commentary (24th rev. ed.). Zondervan Publishing House. ISBN 0-310-25720-4.
- Perdue, Leo G. (2012). Proverbs Interpretation: A Bible Commentary for Teaching and Preaching. Presbyterian Publishing Corp. ISBN 978-0-66423884-1.
- Würthwein, Ernst (1995). The Text of the Old Testament. Translated by Rhodes, Erroll F. Grand Rapids, MI: Wm. B. Eerdmans. ISBN 0-8028-0788-7.
