= Proverbs 3 =

Third chapter of Book of Proverbs in the Bible

- ← chapter 2 chapter 4 →
- The whole Book of Proverbs in the Leningrad Codex (1008 CE) from an old facsimile edition.
- Book: Book of Proverbs
- Category: Ketuvim
- Christian Bible part: Old Testament
- Order in the Christian part: 21

Proverbs 3 is the third chapter of the Book of Proverbs in the Hebrew Bible, or the Old Testament of the Christian Bible. The book is a compilation of several wisdom literature collections, with the heading in 1:1 may be intended to regard Solomon as the traditional author of the whole book, but the dates of the individual collections are difficult to determine. The book probably obtained its final shape in the post-exilic period. This chapter is a part of the first collection of the book.

== Text ==
=== Hebrew ===
The following table shows the Hebrew text of Proverbs 3 with vowels alongside an English translation based upon the JPS 1917 translation (now in the public domain).

Verse	Hebrew	English translation (JPS 1917)
1	בְּ֭נִי תּוֹרָתִ֣י אַל־תִּשְׁכָּ֑ח וּ֝מִצְוֺתַ֗י יִצֹּ֥ר לִבֶּֽךָ׃	My son, forget not my teaching; But let thy heart keep my commandments;
2	כִּ֤י אֹ֣רֶךְ יָ֭מִים וּשְׁנ֣וֹת חַיִּ֑ים וְ֝שָׁל֗וֹם יוֹסִ֥יפוּ לָֽךְ׃	For length of days, and years of life, And peace, will they add to thee.
3	חֶ֥סֶד וֶאֱמֶ֗ת אַֽל־יַ֫עַזְבֻ֥ךָ קׇשְׁרֵ֥ם עַל־גַּרְגְּרוֹתֶ֑יךָ כׇּ֝תְבֵ֗ם עַל־ל֥וּחַ לִבֶּֽךָ׃	Let not kindness and truth forsake thee; Bind them about thy neck, write them upon the table of thy heart;
4	וּמְצָא־חֵ֥ן וְשֵֽׂכֶל־ט֑וֹב בְּעֵינֵ֖י אֱלֹהִ֣ים וְאָדָֽם׃	So shalt thou find grace and good favour In the sight of God and man.
5	בְּטַ֣ח אֶל־יְ֭הֹוָה בְּכׇל־לִבֶּ֑ךָ וְאֶל־בִּ֥֝ינָתְךָ֗ אַל־תִּשָּׁעֵֽן׃	Trust in the LORD with all thy heart, And lean not upon thine own understanding.
6	בְּכׇל־דְּרָכֶ֥יךָ דָעֵ֑הוּ וְ֝ה֗וּא יְיַשֵּׁ֥ר אֹֽרְחֹתֶֽיךָ׃	In all thy ways acknowledge Him, And He will direct thy paths.
7	אַל־תְּהִ֣י חָכָ֣ם בְּעֵינֶ֑יךָ יְרָ֥א אֶת־יְ֝הֹוָ֗ה וְס֣וּר מֵרָֽע׃	Be not wise in thine own eyes; Fear the LORD, and depart from evil;
8	רִ֭פְאוּת תְּהִ֣י לְשׇׁרֶּ֑ךָ וְ֝שִׁקּ֗וּי לְעַצְמוֹתֶֽיךָ׃	It shall be health to thy navel, And marrow to thy bones.
9	כַּבֵּ֣ד אֶת־יְ֭הֹוָה מֵהוֹנֶ֑ךָ וּ֝מֵרֵאשִׁ֗ית כׇּל־תְּבוּאָתֶֽךָ׃	Honour the LORD with thy substance, And with the first-fruits of all thine increase;
10	וְיִמָּלְא֣וּ אֲסָמֶ֣יךָ שָׂבָ֑ע וְ֝תִיר֗וֹשׁ יְקָבֶ֥יךָ יִפְרֹֽצוּ׃	So shall thy barns be filled with plenty, And thy vats shall overflow with new wine.
11	מוּסַ֣ר יְ֭הֹוָה בְּנִ֣י אַל־תִּמְאָ֑ס וְאַל־תָּ֝קֹ֗ץ בְּתוֹכַחְתּֽוֹ׃	My son, despise not the chastening of the LORD, Neither spurn thou His correction;
12	כִּ֤י אֶ֥ת־אֲשֶׁ֣ר יֶאֱהַ֣ב יְהֹוָ֣ה יוֹכִ֑יחַ וּ֝כְאָ֗ב אֶת־בֵּ֥ן יִרְצֶֽה׃	For whom the LORD loveth He correcteth, Even as a father the son in whom he delighteth.
13	אַשְׁרֵ֣י אָ֭דָם מָצָ֣א חׇכְמָ֑ה וְ֝אָדָ֗ם יָפִ֥יק תְּבוּנָֽה׃	Happy is the man that findeth wisdom, And the man that obtaineth understanding.
14	כִּ֤י ט֣וֹב סַ֭חְרָהּ מִסְּחַר־כָּ֑סֶף וּ֝מֵחָר֗וּץ תְּבוּאָתָֽהּ׃	For the merchandise of it is better than the merchandise of silver, And the gain thereof than fine gold.
15	יְקָ֣רָה הִ֭יא (מפניים) [מִפְּנִינִ֑ים] וְכׇל־חֲ֝פָצֶ֗יךָ לֹ֣א יִֽשְׁווּ־בָֽהּ׃	She is more precious than rubies; And all the things thou canst desire are not to be compared unto her.
16	אֹ֣רֶךְ יָ֭מִים בִּֽימִינָ֑הּ בִּ֝שְׂמֹאולָ֗הּ עֹ֣שֶׁר וְכָבֽוֹד׃	Length of days is in her right hand; In her left hand are riches and honour.
17	דְּרָכֶ֥יהָ דַרְכֵי־נֹ֑עַם וְֽכׇל־נְתִ֖יבוֹתֶ֣יהָ שָׁלֽוֹם׃	Her ways are ways of pleasantness, And all her paths are peace.
18	עֵץ־חַיִּ֣ים הִ֭יא לַמַּחֲזִיקִ֣ים בָּ֑הּ וְֽתֹמְכֶ֥יהָ מְאֻשָּֽׁר׃	She is a tree of life to them that lay hold upon her, And happy is every one that holdest her fast.
19	יְֽהֹוָ֗ה בְּחׇכְמָ֥ה יָסַד־אָ֑רֶץ כּוֹנֵ֥ן שָׁ֝מַ֗יִם בִּתְבוּנָֽה׃	The LORD by wisdom founded the earth; By understanding He established the heavens.
20	בְּ֭דַעְתּוֹ תְּהוֹמ֣וֹת נִבְקָ֑עוּ וּ֝שְׁחָקִ֗ים יִרְעֲפוּ־טָֽל׃	By His knowledge the depths were broken up, And the skies drop down the dew.
21	בְּ֭נִי אַל־יָלֻ֣זוּ מֵעֵינֶ֑יךָ נְצֹ֥ר תֻּ֝שִׁיָּ֗ה וּמְזִמָּֽה׃	My son, let not them depart from thine eyes; Keep sound wisdom and discretion;
22	וְיִֽהְי֣וּ חַיִּ֣ים לְנַפְשֶׁ֑ךָ וְ֝חֵ֗ן לְגַרְגְּרֹתֶֽיךָ׃	So shall they be life unto thy soul, And grace to thy neck.
23	אָ֤ז תֵּלֵ֣ךְ לָבֶ֣טַח דַּרְכֶּ֑ךָ וְ֝רַגְלְךָ֗ לֹ֣א תִגּֽוֹף׃	Then shalt thou walk in thy way securely, And thou shalt not dash thy foot.
24	אִם־תִּשְׁכַּ֥ב לֹֽא־תִפְחָ֑ד וְ֝שָׁכַבְתָּ֗ וְֽעָרְבָ֥ה שְׁנָתֶֽךָ׃	When thou liest down, thou shalt not be afraid; Yea, thou shalt lie down, and thy sleep shall be sweet.
25	אַל־תִּ֭ירָא מִפַּ֣חַד פִּתְאֹ֑ם וּמִשֹּׁאַ֥ת רְ֝שָׁעִ֗ים כִּ֣י תָבֹֽא׃	Be not afraid of sudden terror, Neither of the destruction of the wicked, when it cometh;
26	כִּֽי־יְ֭הֹוָה יִֽהְיֶ֣ה בְכִסְלֶ֑ךָ וְשָׁמַ֖ר רַגְלְךָ֣ מִלָּֽכֶד׃	For the LORD will be thy confidence, And will keep thy foot from being caught.
27	אַל־תִּמְנַע־ט֥וֹב מִבְּעָלָ֑יו בִּֽהְי֨וֹת לְאֵ֖ל (ידיך) [יָדְךָ֣] לַעֲשֽׂוֹת׃	Withhold not good from him to whom it is due, When it is in the power of thy hand to do it.
28	אַל־תֹּ֘אמַ֤ר (לרעיך) [לְרֵעֲךָ֨ ׀] לֵ֣ךְ וָ֭שׁוּב וּמָחָ֥ר אֶתֵּ֗ן וְיֵ֣שׁ אִתָּֽךְ׃	Say not unto thy neighbour: ‘Go, and come again, And to-morrow I will give’; when thou hast it by thee.
29	אַל־תַּחֲרֹ֣שׁ עַל־רֵעֲךָ֣ רָעָ֑ה וְהֽוּא־יוֹשֵׁ֖ב לָבֶ֣טַח אִתָּֽךְ׃	Devise not evil against thy neighbour, Seeing he dwelleth securely by thee.
30	אַל־[תָּרִ֣יב] (תרוב) עִם־אָדָ֣ם חִנָּ֑ם אִם־לֹ֖א גְמָלְךָ֣ רָעָֽה׃	Strive not with a man without cause, If he have done thee no harm.
31	אַל־תְּ֭קַנֵּא בְּאִ֣ישׁ חָמָ֑ס וְאַל־תִּ֝בְחַ֗ר בְּכׇל־דְּרָכָֽיו׃	Envy thou not the man of violence, And choose none of his ways.
32	כִּ֤י תוֹעֲבַ֣ת יְהֹוָ֣ה נָל֑וֹז וְֽאֶת־יְשָׁרִ֥ים סוֹדֽוֹ׃	For the perverse is an abomination to the LORD; But His counsel is with the upright.
33	מְאֵרַ֣ת יְ֭הֹוָה בְּבֵ֣ית רָשָׁ֑ע וּנְוֵ֖ה צַדִּיקִ֣ים יְבָרֵֽךְ׃	The curse of the LORD is in the house of the wicked; But He blesseth the habitation of the righteous.
34	אִם־לַלֵּצִ֥ים הֽוּא־יָלִ֑יץ (ולעניים) [וְ֝לַעֲנָוִ֗ים] יִתֶּן־חֵֽן׃	If it concerneth the scorners, He scorneth them, But unto the humble He giveth grace.
35	כָּ֭בוֹד חֲכָמִ֣ים יִנְחָ֑לוּ וּ֝כְסִילִ֗ים מֵרִ֥ים קָלֽוֹן׃	The wise shall inherit honour; But as for the fools, they carry away shame.

=== Textual witnesses ===
Some early manuscripts containing the text of this chapter in Biblical Hebrew are of the Masoretic Text, which includes the Aleppo Codex (10th century), and Codex Leningradensis (1008).

There is also a translation into Koine Greek known as the Septuagint, made in the last few centuries BCE. Extant ancient manuscripts of the Septuagint version include Codex Vaticanus (B; $\mathfrak{G}$^{B}; 4th century), Codex Sinaiticus (S; BHK: $\mathfrak{G}$^{S}; 4th century), and Codex Alexandrinus (A; $\mathfrak{G}$^{A}; 5th century).

== Analysis ==
This chapter belongs to a section regarded as the first collection in the book of Proverbs (comprising Proverbs 1–9), known as "Didactic discourses". The Jerusalem Bible describes chapters 1–9 as a prologue of the chapters 10–22:16, the so-called "[actual] proverbs of Solomon", as "the body of the book". The chapter has the following structure:

- introductory exhortation (1–4),
- an admonition to be faithful to the Lord (5–12).
- commendation of Wisdom as
  - the most valuable possession (13–18),
  - essential to creation (19–20), and
  - the way to a long and safe life (21–26)
- a warning to avoid unneighborliness (27–30) and emulating the wicked (31–35).

== Trust in God (3:1–12) ==
This passage stands out among the instructions in the first collection (chapters 1–9), because of its spiritual content that may be seen as a development to the motto of the whole book in Proverbs 1:7–9, that "Wisdom consists in complete trust in and submission to God". It is related to 'loyalty and faithfulness', which can refer to (and may be intended about both) relationships between human and God (cf. Jeremiah 2:2 and Hosea 6:4) or human to human (cf. Psalm 109:16; Hosea 4:1; Micah 6:8), and are to be 'worn as an adornment around the neck' (cf. Proverbs 1:9 and Deuteronomy 6:8, 11:18) as well as 'written on the heart' (cf. Jeremiah 31:33). As the kernel of the instructions in this chapter, 'trust in God' is contrasted in verses 5 and 6 with self-reliance, saying that the best action is the complete commitment and submission to God ('all your ways'). The analogy of medicinal healing benefits of wisdom (verse 8) recurs in Proverbs 15:30, 16:24, and 17:22; although sometimes tastes bitter (suffering adversity), it is a divine chastisement and a proof of God's fatherly love (cf. Job 5:17–18; 33:14–30; for Christians: Hebrews 12:5–6).

=== Verse 1 ===
My son, do not forget my teaching,

but let your heart keep my commandments;

- "Teaching": from Hebrew root torah, "guidance, direction" (cf. Proverbs 1:9), paralleling 'commandments', from Hebrew root mitzvah; both terms may refer to "the law of God" although here it is applied in wisdom instruction.

=== Verse 2 ===
My teaching will give you a long and prosperous life.

=== Verses 5–6 ===
^{5}Trust in the Lord with all your heart,

and do not lean on your own understanding.

^{6} In all your ways acknowledge him,

and he will make straight your paths.

- "Trust": from Hebrew root batakh, related to the words rendered 'securely' in Proverbs 3:23 (cf. Proverbs 1:33) and 'confidence' in Proverbs 14:26; in the Hebrew Bible is used in (1) literal physical sense (physically lean on something for support) and (2) figurative sense (rely on something/someone for help or protection), often in the negative context of false securities, trusting in worthless things, but here in the context of security the Lord who is a 'reliable object of confidence'.

== Commendation of Wisdom (3:13–35) ==
Verses 13–18 form a hymnic celebration of the 'happiness' in finding wisdom, as if possessing a vastly valuable asset, unfailingly pays a higher dividend than silver or gold (verse 14), and beyond comparison is a rare and priceless treasure (verse 15), providing a good quality of long life, riches, and honor (verse 16) and leading to pleasant and peaceful paths (verse 17), metaphorically like 'the tree of life' in the garden of Eden (verse 18; Genesis 2–3 as the vital source for nourishing growth and promoting fullness of life (cf. Proverbs 11:30; 13:12; 15:4). By Wisdom the world was created and is sustained (verses 19–20; cf. Proverbs 8:22–31), as Wisdom can 'fructify' life. Those who hold fast to Wisdom and trust in God (verses 21–26; cf. verses 5–8) will have secure and tranquil lives. The application is by inculcating kindness and neighbourliness, while avoiding malicious actions and unnecessary confrontations (verses 27–30. Verses 31–35 warn against envying evil men and imitating their ways, because God's judgement ('curse', cf. Deuteronomy 27:15–26) remains on their house, that they are unable to enjoy the divine blessing as the upright persons, and will be utterly disgraced.

== Uses ==
The milkshake cups' bottom of In-N-Out Burger has the text "PROVERBS 3:5", which refers to the 5th verse of this chapter.

== See also ==
- Blessing
- Divine judgment
- Divine providence
- Earth
- Evil
- Heaven
- Longevity
- Mercy
- Mitzvah
- Peace
- Righteousness
- Wisdom
- YHWH
- Related Bible parts: Psalm 5, Proverbs 1, Proverbs 2, Proverbs 5, Proverbs 7, Proverbs 23

== Sources ==
- Aitken, K. T. (2007). "19. Proverbs". In Barton, John; Muddiman, John (eds.). The Oxford Bible Commentary (first (paperback) ed.). Oxford University Press. pp. 405–422. ISBN 978-0199277186.
- Alter, Robert (2010). The Wisdom Books: Job, Proverbs, and Ecclesiastes: A Translation with Commentary. W.W. Norton & Co. ISBN 978-0393080735.
- Coogan, Michael David (2007). Coogan, Michael David; Brettler, Marc Zvi; Newsom, Carol Ann; Perkins, Pheme (eds.). The New Oxford Annotated Bible with the Apocryphal/Deuterocanonical Books: New Revised Standard Version, Issue 48 (Augmented 3rd ed.). Oxford University Press. ISBN 9780195288810.
- Farmer, Kathleen A. (1998). "The Wisdom Books". In McKenzie, Steven L.; Graham, Matt Patrick (eds.). The Hebrew Bible Today: An Introduction to Critical Issues. Westminster John Knox Press. ISBN 978-0-66425652-4.
- Fox, Michael V. (2009). Proverbs 10-31: A New Translation with Introduction and Commentary. Anchor Yale Bible Commentaries. Yale University Press. ISBN 978-0300155563.
- Halley, Henry H. (1965). Halley's Bible Handbook: an abbreviated Bible commentary (24th (revised) ed.). Zondervan Publishing House. ISBN 0-310-25720-4.
- Perdue, Leo G. (2012). Proverbs Interpretation: A Bible Commentary for Teaching and Preaching. Presbyterian Publishing Corporation. ISBN 978-0664238841.
- Würthwein, Ernst (1995). The Text of the Old Testament. Translated by Rhodes, Erroll F. Grand Rapids, MI: Wm. B. Eerdmans. ISBN 0-8028-0788-7.
