= Proverbs 5 =

Fifth chapter of the biblical book of Proverbs

- ← chapter 4 chapter 6 →
- The whole Book of Proverbs in the Leningrad Codex (1008 C.E.) from an old facsimile edition.
- Book: Book of Proverbs
- Category: Ketuvim
- Christian Bible part: Old Testament
- Order in the Christian part: 21

Proverbs 5 is the fifth chapter of the Book of Proverbs in the Hebrew Bible or the Old Testament of the Christian Bible. The book is a compilation of several wisdom literature collections, with the heading in 1:1 may be intended to regard Solomon as the traditional author of the whole book, but the dates of the individual collections are difficult to determine, and the book probably obtained its final shape in the post-exilic period. This chapter is a part of the first collection of the book, focusing on "the dangers of the strange woman".

== Text ==
=== Hebrew ===
The following table shows the Hebrew text of Proverbs 5 with vowels alongside an English translation based upon the JPS 1917 translation (now in the public domain).

Verse	Hebrew	English translation (JPS 1917)
1	בְּ֭נִי לְחׇכְמָתִ֣י הַקְשִׁ֑יבָה לִ֝תְבוּנָתִ֗י הַט־אׇזְנֶֽךָ׃	My son, attend unto my wisdom; Incline thine ear to my understanding;
2	לִשְׁמֹ֥ר מְזִמּ֑וֹת וְ֝דַ֗עַת שְׂפָתֶ֥יךָ יִנְצֹֽרוּ׃	That thou mayest preserve discretion, And that thy lips may keep knowledge.
3	כִּ֤י נֹ֣פֶת תִּ֭טֹּפְנָה שִׂפְתֵ֣י זָרָ֑ה וְחָלָ֖ק מִשֶּׁ֣מֶן חִכָּֽהּ׃	For the lips of a strange woman drop honey, And her mouth is smoother than oil;
4	וְֽ֭אַחֲרִיתָהּ מָרָ֣ה כַֽלַּעֲנָ֑ה חַ֝דָּ֗ה כְּחֶ֣רֶב פִּיּֽוֹת׃	But her end is bitter as wormwood, Sharp as a two-edged sword.
5	רַ֭גְלֶיהָ יֹרְד֣וֹת מָ֑וֶת שְׁ֝א֗וֹל צְעָדֶ֥יהָ יִתְמֹֽכוּ׃	Her feet go down to death; Her steps take hold on the nether-world;
6	אֹ֣רַח חַ֭יִּים פֶּן־תְּפַלֵּ֑ס נָע֥וּ מַ֝עְגְּלֹתֶ֗יהָ לֹ֣א תֵדָֽע׃	Lest she should walk the even path of life, Her ways wander, but she knoweth it not.
7	וְעַתָּ֣ה בָ֭נִים שִׁמְעוּ־לִ֑י וְאַל־תָּ֝ס֗וּרוּ מֵאִמְרֵי־פִֽי׃	Now therefore, O ye children, hearken unto me, And depart not from the words of my mouth.
8	הַרְחֵ֣ק מֵעָלֶ֣יהָ דַרְכֶּ֑ךָ וְאַל־תִּ֝קְרַ֗ב אֶל־פֶּ֥תַח בֵּיתָֽהּ׃	Remove thy way far from her, And come not nigh the door of her house;
9	פֶּן־תִּתֵּ֣ן לַאֲחֵרִ֣ים הוֹדֶ֑ךָ וּ֝שְׁנֹתֶ֗יךָ לְאַכְזָרִֽי׃	Lest thou give thy vigour unto others, And thy years unto the cruel;
10	פֶּֽן־יִשְׂבְּע֣וּ זָרִ֣ים כֹּחֶ֑ךָ וַ֝עֲצָבֶ֗יךָ בְּבֵ֣ית נׇכְרִֽי׃	Lest strangers be filled with thy strength, And thy labours be in the house of an alien;
11	וְנָהַמְתָּ֥ בְאַחֲרִיתֶ֑ךָ בִּכְל֥וֹת בְּ֝שָׂרְךָ֗ וּשְׁאֵרֶֽךָ׃	And thou moan, when thine end cometh, When thy flesh and thy body are consumed,
12	וְֽאָמַרְתָּ֗ אֵ֭יךְ שָׂנֵ֣אתִי מוּסָ֑ר וְ֝תוֹכַ֗חַת נָאַ֥ץ לִבִּֽי׃	And say: ‘How have I hated instruction, And my heart despised reproof;
13	וְֽלֹא־שָׁ֭מַעְתִּי בְּק֣וֹל מוֹרָ֑י וְ֝לִֽמְלַמְּדַ֗י לֹֽא־הִטִּ֥יתִי אׇזְנִֽי׃	Neither have I hearkened to the voice of my teachers, Nor inclined mine ear to them that instructed me!
14	כִּ֭מְעַט הָיִ֣יתִי בְכׇל־רָ֑ע בְּת֖וֹךְ קָהָ֣ל וְעֵדָֽה׃	I was well nigh in all evil In the midst of the congregation and assembly.’
15	שְׁתֵה־מַ֥יִם מִבּוֹרֶ֑ךָ וְ֝נֹזְלִ֗ים מִתּ֥וֹךְ בְּאֵרֶֽךָ׃	Drink waters out of thine own cistern, And running waters out of thine own well.
16	יָפ֣וּצוּ מַעְיְנֹתֶ֣יךָ ח֑וּצָה בָּ֝רְחֹב֗וֹת פַּלְגֵי־מָֽיִם׃	Let thy springs be dispersed abroad, And courses of water in the streets.
17	יִֽהְיוּ־לְךָ֥ לְבַדֶּ֑ךָ וְאֵ֖ין לְזָרִ֣ים אִתָּֽךְ׃	Let them be only thine own, And not strangers’with thee.
18	יְהִֽי־מְקוֹרְךָ֥ בָר֑וּךְ וּ֝שְׂמַ֗ח מֵאֵ֥שֶׁת נְעוּרֶֽךָ׃	Let thy fountain be blessed; And have joy of the wife of thy youth.
19	אַיֶּ֥לֶת אֲהָבִ֗ים וְֽיַ֫עֲלַת־חֵ֥ן דַּ֭דֶּיהָ יְרַוֻּ֣ךָ בְכׇל־עֵ֑ת בְּ֝אַהֲבָתָ֗הּ תִּשְׁגֶּ֥ה תָמִֽיד׃	A lovely hind and a graceful doe, Let her breasts satisfy thee at all times; With her love be thou ravished always.
20	וְלָ֤מָּה תִשְׁגֶּ֣ה בְנִ֣י בְזָרָ֑ה וּ֝תְחַבֵּ֗ק חֵ֣ק נׇכְרִיָּֽה׃	Why then wilt thou, my son, be ravished with a strange woman, And embrace the bosom of an alien?
21	כִּ֤י נֹ֨כַח ׀ עֵינֵ֣י יְ֭הֹוָה דַּרְכֵי־אִ֑ישׁ וְֽכׇל־מַעְגְּלֹתָ֥יו מְפַלֵּֽס׃	For the ways of man are before the eyes of the LORD, And He maketh even all his paths.
22	עֲֽווֹנֹתָ֗יו יִלְכְּדֻנ֥וֹ אֶת־הָרָשָׁ֑ע וּבְחַבְלֵ֥י חַ֝טָּאת֗וֹ יִתָּמֵֽךְ׃	His own iniquities shall ensnare the wicked, And he shall be holden with the cords of his sin.
23	ה֗וּא יָ֭מוּת בְּאֵ֣ין מוּסָ֑ר וּבְרֹ֖ב אִוַּלְתּ֣וֹ יִשְׁגֶּֽה׃	He shall die for lack of instruction; And in the greatness of his folly he shall reel.

=== Textual witnesses ===
Some early manuscripts containing the text of this chapter in Hebrew are of the Masoretic Text, which includes the Aleppo Codex (10th century), and Codex Leningradensis (1008).

There is also a translation into Koine Greek known as the Septuagint, made in the last few centuries BC; some extant ancient manuscripts of this version include Codex Vaticanus (B; $\mathfrak{G}$^{B}; 4th century), Codex Sinaiticus (S; BHK: $\mathfrak{G}$^{S}; 4th century), and Codex Alexandrinus (A; $\mathfrak{G}$^{A}; 5th century).

== Analysis ==
This chapter belongs to a section regarded as the first collection in the book of Proverbs (comprising Proverbs 1–9), known as "Didactic discourses". The Jerusalem Bible describes chapters 1–9 as a prologue of the chapters 10–22:16, the so-called "[actual] proverbs of Solomon", as "the body of the book".

This chapter has the following structure:

- First exhortation of discretion (verses 1, 2) followed by an explanation on how to avoid seduction (verses 3–6)
- Second exhortation to prevention (verses 7, 8) then an explanation that obedience will avoid ruin and regret (verses 9–14)
- Warning against sharing love with strangers (15–17) but to find it at home (18–23).

Sub-titled "The Peril of Adultery" in the New King James Version, this chapter contains the first of three poems on the "forbidden woman", the “stranger” outside the social boundaries of Israel; the other two are Proverbs 6:20–35 and Proverbs 7. Verse 5 suggests that the woman is "as bitter as wormwood", a comparison used several times in the Hebrew Bible, by the prophets Jeremiah and Amos, also in Deuteronomy.

== Avoid the seductress (verses 1–14) ==
The passage continues the instruction against the "loose woman" (or "seductress") introduced in Proverbs 2:16–19 (cf. Proverbs 6:20–35; 7:1–27), starting with a typical appeal to the child to listen carefully to receive the necessary knowledge for avoiding entanglement with her (verses 1–2). The seductress makes use of her natural sex appeal (cf. Proverbs 6:25, but mainly relying on her seductive speech (cf. Proverbs 7:14–20), which is compared with honey for sweetness (cf. Proverbs 16:24; Judges 14:8, 14; bride's kisses in Song 4:11) and oil for smoothness (verse 8; flattery in Proverbs 29:5; hypocrisy in Psalm 5:9). A contrast is given in verses 3–4 between honey (sweet) and wormwood (bitter; Jeremiah 9:15; Amos 5:7) and between oil (smooth) and double-edged sword (sharp; Psalm 55:21). However, any promise of pleasure and enjoyment, would bring different reality ('in the end'; verse 4) as the seductress travels the path to Sheol (verse 5; cf. 2:18–19; 7:27) with 'the unsteady steps of a drunkard' ('wander'; cf. Isaiah 28:7) staggering from one lover to another not knowing that she brings harm to herself or to her victims (cf. Proverbs 7:21-7; 30:20).

A second appeal for attentiveness (verse 7) is followed by succinct advice (cf. Proverbs 1:15; 4:15) and expositions of the consequences of liaison with her (verses 9–14): the loss of dignity and honor (verse 9), of hard-earned wealth (verse 10), and of vigor and health (verse 11); all of which is the antithesis of Wisdom's benediction (Proverbs 3:13-18). Rejecting wise counsel or learning the lesson too late would produce a lamentation in verses 12–14 (cf. Proverbs 1:24–28).

=== Verse 1 ===
My son, attend to my wisdom,

and bow your ear to my understanding,

- "Bow": or "incline" to "listen carefully"

=== Verse 2 ===
that you may keep discretion,
and your lips may guard knowledge.

=== Verse 7 ===
Wisdom is the principal thing;

Therefore get wisdom.

And in all your getting, get understanding.

Aitken stresses the need to acquire wisdom "at all costs", and the Jerusalem Bible advises that "one must first realise that it is essential to have it and that it demands self-sacrifice". Similarly the modern World English Bible's translation advises, Yes, though it costs all your possessions, get understanding.

== Be faithful to your wife (verses 15–23) ==
This passage more specifically address married men, advising that the best way to avoid the temptation of the seductress is that he remain faithful to his wife and derive sexual satisfaction from her, using the imagery of water, fountain, springs and streams to enjoy and not be wasted (cf. Song 4:12, 15). A husband should always place an image of his wife as a 'graceful doe', a symbol of her beauty (verse 18; cf. Song 2:7). Verse 21 reminds the husband of the 'scrutinizing eyes of the Lord' (cf. Proverbs 15:3; Job 31:4; 34:21) and his guardianship of the moral order, and that the consequence of indiscipline and folly would be 'reaping what has been sown' (cf. Proverbs 1:19; 2:20–22), and like a man threading a noose around his own neck or a senseless bird ensnared in the net (cf. Proverbs 1:17-19).

=== Verse 18 ===
Let your fountain be blessed,

and rejoice with the wife of your youth.

- "Blessed" comes from the passive participle form of the Hebrew word בָּרַךְ, barakh, meaning that the sexual delight is God-given and endowed with fruitfulness, that it would fulfill God's intention.
- "The wife of your youth" refers to the age in which a man married his wife: "the wife you married in your youth" (cf. NCV, CEV); the temporal genitive form of the word "youth" is supported by similar constructions in parallel passages (cf. Proverbs 2:17; Malachi 2:14).

== See also ==
- Blessing
- Divine judgment
- Evil
- Hubris
- Pride
- Righteousness
- Sexual ethics
- Sheol
- Sin
- Soul
- Truth
- Understanding
- Wickedness
- Wisdom
- YHWH
- Related Bible parts: Proverbs 1, Proverbs 2, Proverbs 7, Proverbs 9, Proverbs 15, Song of Songs 2, Song of Songs 4

== Sources ==
- Aitken, K. T. (2007). "19. Proverbs". In Barton, John; Muddiman, John (eds.). The Oxford Bible Commentary (first (paperback) ed.). Oxford University Press. pp. 405–422. ISBN 978-0199277186.
- Alter, Robert (2010). The Wisdom Books: Job, Proverbs, and Ecclesiastes: A Translation with Commentary. W.W. Norton & Co. ISBN 978-0393080735.
- Coogan, Michael David (2007). Coogan, Michael David; Brettler, Marc Zvi; Newsom, Carol Ann; Perkins, Pheme (eds.). The New Oxford Annotated Bible with the Apocryphal/Deuterocanonical Books: New Revised Standard Version, Issue 48 (Augmented 3rd ed.). Oxford University Press. ISBN 9780195288810.
- Farmer, Kathleen A. (1998). "The Wisdom Books". In McKenzie, Steven L.; Graham, Matt Patrick (eds.). The Hebrew Bible Today: An Introduction to Critical Issues. Westminster John Knox Press. ISBN 978-0-66425652-4.
- Fox, Michael V. (2009). Proverbs 10-31: A New Translation with Introduction and Commentary. Anchor Yale Bible Commentaries. Yale University Press. ISBN 978-0300155563.
- Halley, Henry H. (1965). Halley's Bible Handbook: an abbreviated Bible commentary (24th (revised) ed.). Zondervan Publishing House. ISBN 0-310-25720-4.
- Perdue, Leo G. (2012). Proverbs Interpretation: A Bible Commentary for Teaching and Preaching. Presbyterian Publishing Corporation. ISBN 978-0664238841.
- Würthwein, Ernst (1995). The Text of the Old Testament. Translated by Rhodes, Erroll F. Grand Rapids, MI: Wm. B. Eerdmans. ISBN 0-8028-0788-7.
