= Proverbs 8 =

Eighth chapter of the biblical book of Proverbs

- ← chapter 7 chapter 9 →
- The whole Book of Proverbs in the Leningrad Codex (1008 C.E.) from an old facsimile edition.
- Book: Book of Proverbs
- Category: Ketuvim
- Christian Bible part: Old Testament
- Order in the Christian part: 21

Proverbs 8 is the eighth chapter of the Book of Proverbs in the Hebrew Bible or the Old Testament of the Christian Bible. The book is a compilation of several wisdom literature collections: this chapter is a part of the first collection. The heading in 1:1 may be intended to regard Solomon as the traditional author of the whole book, but the dates of the individual collections are difficult to determine. The book probably obtained its final shape in the post-exilic period.

== Text ==
=== Hebrew ===
The following table shows the Hebrew text of Proverbs 8 with vowels alongside an English translation based upon the JPS 1917 translation (now in the public domain).

Verse	Hebrew	English translation (JPS 1917)
1	הֲלֹֽא־חׇכְמָ֥ה תִקְרָ֑א וּ֝תְבוּנָ֗ה תִּתֵּ֥ן קוֹלָֽהּ׃	Doth not wisdom call, And understanding put forth her voice?
2	בְּרֹאשׁ־מְרֹמִ֥ים עֲלֵי־דָ֑רֶךְ בֵּ֖ית נְתִיב֣וֹת נִצָּֽבָה׃	In the top of high places by the way, Where the paths meet, she standeth;
3	לְיַד־שְׁעָרִ֥ים לְפִי־קָ֑רֶת מְב֖וֹא פְתָחִ֣ים תָּרֹֽנָּה׃	Beside the gates, at the entry of the city, At the coming in at the doors, she crieth aloud:
4	אֲלֵיכֶ֣ם אִישִׁ֣ים אֶקְרָ֑א וְ֝קוֹלִ֗י אֶל־בְּנֵ֥י אָדָֽם׃	’Unto you, O men, I call, And my voice is to the sons of men.
5	הָבִ֣ינוּ פְתָאיִ֣ם עׇרְמָ֑ה וּ֝כְסִילִ֗ים הָבִ֥ינוּ לֵֽב׃	O ye thoughtless, understand prudence, And, ye fools, be ye of an understanding heart.
6	שִׁ֭מְעוּ כִּֽי־נְגִידִ֣ים אֲדַבֵּ֑ר וּמִפְתַּ֥ח שְׂ֝פָתַ֗י מֵישָׁרִֽים׃	Hear, for I will speak excellent things, And the opening of my lips shall be right things.
7	כִּֽי־אֱ֭מֶת יֶהְגֶּ֣ה חִכִּ֑י וְתוֹעֲבַ֖ת שְׂפָתַ֣י רֶֽשַׁע׃	For my mouth shall utter truth, And wickedness is an abomination to my lips.
8	בְּצֶ֥דֶק כׇּל־אִמְרֵי־פִ֑י אֵ֥ין בָּ֝הֶ֗ם נִפְתָּ֥ל וְעִקֵּֽשׁ׃	All the words of my mouth are in righteousness, There is nothing perverse or crooked in them.
9	כֻּלָּ֣ם נְ֭כֹחִים לַמֵּבִ֑ין וִ֝ישָׁרִ֗ים לְמֹ֣צְאֵי דָֽעַת׃	They are all plain to him that understandeth, And right to them that find knowledge.
10	קְחֽוּ־מוּסָרִ֥י וְאַל־כָּ֑סֶף וְ֝דַ֗עַת מֵחָר֥וּץ נִבְחָֽר׃	Receive my instruction, and not silver, And knowledge rather than choice gold.
11	כִּֽי־טוֹבָ֣ה חׇ֭כְמָה מִפְּנִינִ֑ים וְכׇל־חֲ֝פָצִ֗ים לֹ֣א יִֽשְׁווּ־בָֽהּ׃	For wisdom is better than rubies, And all things desirable are not to be compared unto her.
12	אֲֽנִי־חׇ֭כְמָה שָׁכַ֣נְתִּי עׇרְמָ֑ה וְדַ֖עַת מְזִמּ֣וֹת אֶמְצָֽא׃	I wisdom dwell with prudence, And find out knowledge of devices.
13	יִ֥רְאַ֣ת יְהֹוָה֮ שְֽׂנֹ֫את־רָ֥ע גֵּ֘אָ֤ה וְגָא֨וֹן ׀ וְדֶ֣רֶךְ רָ֭ע וּפִ֨י תַהְפֻּכ֬וֹת שָׂנֵֽאתִי׃	The fear of the LORD is to hate evil; Pride, and arrogancy, and the evil way, And the froward mouth, do I hate.
14	לִֽי־עֵ֭צָה וְתוּשִׁיָּ֑ה אֲנִ֥י בִ֝ינָ֗ה לִ֣י גְבוּרָֽה׃	Counsel is mine, and sound wisdom; I am understanding, power is mine.
15	בִּ֭י מְלָכִ֣ים יִמְלֹ֑כוּ וְ֝רֹזְנִ֗ים יְחֹ֣קְקוּ צֶֽדֶק׃	By me kings reign, And princes decree justice.
16	בִּ֭י שָׂרִ֣ים יָשֹׂ֑רוּ וּ֝נְדִיבִ֗ים כׇּל־שֹׁ֥פְטֵי צֶֽדֶק׃	By me princes rule, And nobles, even all the judges of the earth.
17	אֲ֭נִי (אהביה) [אֹהֲבַ֣י] אֵהָ֑ב וּ֝מְשַׁחֲרַ֗י יִמְצָאֻֽנְנִי׃	I love them that love me, And those that seek me earnestly shall find me.
18	עֹֽשֶׁר־וְכָב֥וֹד אִתִּ֑י ה֥וֹן עָ֝תֵ֗ק וּצְדָקָֽה׃	Riches and honour are with me; Yea, enduring riches and righteousness.
19	ט֣וֹב פִּ֭רְיִי מֵחָר֣וּץ וּמִפָּ֑ז וּ֝תְבוּאָתִ֗י מִכֶּ֥סֶף נִבְחָֽר׃	My fruit is better than gold, yea, than fine gold; And my produce than choice silver.
20	בְּאֹֽרַח־צְדָקָ֥ה אֲהַלֵּ֑ךְ בְּ֝ת֗וֹךְ נְתִיב֥וֹת מִשְׁפָּֽט׃	I walk in the way of righteousness, In the midst of the paths of justice;
21	לְהַנְחִ֖יל אֹהֲבַ֥י ׀ יֵ֑שׁ וְאֹצְרֹ֖תֵיהֶ֣ם אֲמַלֵּֽא׃	That I may cause those that love me to inherit substance, And that I may fill their treasuries.
22	יְֽהֹוָ֗ה קָ֭נָנִי רֵאשִׁ֣ית דַּרְכּ֑וֹ קֶ֖דֶם מִפְעָלָ֣יו מֵאָֽז׃	The LORD made me as the beginning of His way, The first of His works of old.
23	מֵ֭עוֹלָם נִסַּ֥כְתִּי מֵרֹ֗אשׁ מִקַּדְמֵי־אָֽרֶץ׃	I was set up from everlasting, from the beginning, Or ever the earth was.
24	בְּאֵין־תְּהֹמ֥וֹת חוֹלָ֑לְתִּי בְּאֵ֥ין מַ֝עְיָנ֗וֹת נִכְבַּדֵּי־מָֽיִם׃	When there were no depths, I was brought forth; When there were no fountains abounding with water.
25	בְּטֶ֣רֶם הָרִ֣ים הׇטְבָּ֑עוּ לִפְנֵ֖י גְבָע֣וֹת חוֹלָֽלְתִּי׃	Before the mountains were settled, Before the hills was I brought forth;
26	עַד־לֹ֣א עָ֭שָׂה אֶ֣רֶץ וְחוּצ֑וֹת וְ֝רֹ֗אשׁ עַפְר֥וֹת תֵּבֵֽל׃	While as yet He had not made the earth, nor the fields, Nor the beginning of the dust of the world.
27	בַּהֲכִינ֣וֹ שָׁ֭מַיִם שָׁ֣ם אָ֑נִי בְּחֻ֥קוֹ ח֝֗וּג עַל־פְּנֵ֥י תְהֽוֹם׃	When He established the heavens, I was there; When He set a circle upon the face of the deep,
28	בְּאַמְּצ֣וֹ שְׁחָקִ֣ים מִמָּ֑עַל בַּ֝עֲז֗וֹז עִינ֥וֹת תְּהֽוֹם׃	When He made firm the skies above, When the fountains of the deep showed their might,
29	בְּשׂ֘וּמ֤וֹ לַיָּ֨ם ׀ חֻקּ֗וֹ וּ֭מַיִם לֹ֣א יַֽעַבְרוּ־פִ֑יו בְּ֝חוּק֗וֹ מ֣וֹסְדֵי אָֽרֶץ׃	When He gave to the sea His decree, That the waters should not transgress His commandment, When He appointed the foundations of the earth;
30	וָאֶהְיֶ֥ה אֶצְל֗וֹ אָ֫מ֥וֹן וָאֶהְיֶ֣ה שַׁ֭עֲשׁוּעִים י֤וֹם ׀ י֑וֹם מְשַׂחֶ֖קֶת לְפָנָ֣יו בְּכׇל־עֵֽת׃	Then I was by Him, as a nursling; And I was daily all delight, Playing always before Him,
31	מְ֭שַׂחֶקֶת בְּתֵבֵ֣ל אַרְצ֑וֹ וְ֝שַׁעֲשֻׁעַ֗י אֶת־בְּנֵ֥י אָדָֽם׃	Playing in His habitable earth, And my delights are with the sons of men.
32	וְעַתָּ֣ה בָ֭נִים שִׁמְעוּ־לִ֑י וְ֝אַשְׁרֵ֗י דְּרָכַ֥י יִשְׁמֹֽרוּ׃	Now therefore, ye children, hearken unto me; For happy are they that keep my ways.
33	שִׁמְע֖וּ מוּסָ֥ר וַחֲכָ֗מוּ וְאַל־תִּפְרָֽעוּ׃	Hear instruction, and be wise, And refuse it not.
34	אַ֥שְֽׁרֵי אָדָם֮ שֹׁמֵ֢עַֽ֫ לִ֥י לִשְׁקֹ֣ד עַל־דַּ֭לְתֹתַי י֤וֹם ׀ י֑וֹם לִ֝שְׁמֹ֗ר מְזוּזֹ֥ת פְּתָחָֽי׃	Happy is the man that hearkeneth to me, Watching daily at my gates, waiting at the posts of my doors.
35	כִּ֣י מֹ֭צְאִי (מצאי) [מָצָ֣א] חַיִּ֑ים וַיָּ֥פֶק רָ֝צ֗וֹן מֵיְהֹוָֽה׃	For whoso findeth me findeth life, And obtaineth favour of the LORD
36	וְֽ֭חֹטְאִי חֹמֵ֣ס נַפְשׁ֑וֹ כׇּל־מְ֝שַׂנְאַ֗י אָ֣הֲבוּ מָֽוֶת׃	But he that misseth me wrongeth his own soul; All they that hate me love death.’

=== Textual witnesses ===
Some early manuscripts containing the text of this chapter in Hebrew are of the Masoretic Text, which includes the Aleppo Codex (10th century), and Codex Leningradensis (1008).

There is also a translation into Koine Greek known as the Septuagint, made in the last few centuries BC; some extant ancient manuscripts of this version include Codex Vaticanus (B; $\mathfrak{G}$^{B}; 4th century), Codex Sinaiticus (S; BHK: $\mathfrak{G}$^{S}; 4th century), and Codex Alexandrinus (A; $\mathfrak{G}$^{A}; 5th century).

== Analysis ==
This chapter belongs to a section regarded as the first collection in the Book of Proverbs (comprising Proverbs 1–9), known as "Didactic discourses". The Jerusalem Bible describes chapters 1–9 as a prologue of the chapters 10–22:16, the so-called "[actual] proverbs of Solomon", as "the body of the book". Anglican commentator T. T. Perowne, in the Cambridge Bible for Schools and Colleges, calls the section comprising chapters 1 to 9 "The Appeal of Wisdom", a title also reserved in particular for Proverbs 8.

The chapter contains the so-called "Wisdom's Second Speech" (the "First Speech" is in Proverbs 1:20–33), but whereas in Proverbs 1 Wisdom proclaims her value, and in Proverbs 3:19–26 Wisdom is the agent of creation, here Wisdom is personified, not as a deity like Egypt's Ma'at or the Assyrian-Babylonian Ishtar, but simply presented as a 'self-conscious divine being distinct but subordinate to God', which in reality is the personification of the attribute of wisdom displayed by God. A connection between Wisdom and Jesus Christ is only in that both reveals the nature of God, but Proverbs 8 states wisdom as a creation of God, while Jesus’ claims as one with God includes wisdom (Matthew 12:42; even personified wisdom in a way that was similar to Proverbs in Matthew 11:19) and a unique knowledge of God (Matthew 11:25–27). Paul the Apostle sees the fulfillment of wisdom in Christ (Colossians 1:15–20; 2:3) and affirms that Christ became believers' wisdom in the crucifixion (1 Corinthians 1:24, 30).

The chapter is very significant in Gnosticism, as they take "wisdom" to be referring to Sophia, the divine feminine incarnation of wisdom and truth.

The structure of chapter involves three cycles of Wisdom's invitation:

1. An introduction (verses 1–3) precedes the first invitation (verses 4, 5) and explanation that she is noble, just, and true (6–9).
2. The second invitation (verse 10) is accompanied by an explanation that she is valuable (11–21).
3. Finally, Wisdom tells how she preceded and delights in creation (verses 22–31) before concluding with the third invitation (32–36).

Aitken divides this chapter into the following sections:

- Verses 1–11: personified Wisdom assumes the role of a wisdom teacher.
- Verses 12–21: Wisdom extols her providential role in the good and orderly government of the world (verses 12–16) and as the giver of wealth (verses 17–21)
- Verses 22–26: Wisdom's hymn of self-praise: before creation
- Verses 27–31: Wisdom's hymn of self-praise: at or during creation
- Verses 32–36: Conclusion.

== Wisdom's first invitation (verses 1–9) ==
The introduction (verses 1–3) presents Wisdom as a teacher, without the note of reproach and threat in her first speech (Proverbs 1:20–33). After giving the first invitation (verses 4–5), the emphasis is given on the character of Wisdom's words (verses 6–9) that, in contrast to the duplicitous and fraudulent words of the seductress, the words of Wisdom are in plain language, yet with integrity, which is intelligible to all who find her (verse 9).

=== Verse 1 ===
Does not wisdom cry out,

and understanding lift up her voice?

Wisdom speaks openly and publicly, not in secret or steathily like the evil seductress, just as Jesus Christ said that he has spoken openly to the world and said nothing in secret (John 18:20).

Some translations and paraphrases treat personify "Wisdom" and "Understanding" as characters speaking out, for example in the New American Bible, Revised Edition:

Does not Wisdom call,
and Understanding raise her voice?

and in The Voice translation:

Isn't Lady Wisdom calling?

=== Verse 2 ===
On the heights, beside the way, at the crossroads she takes her stand.

American theologian Albert Barnes notes the contrast between Wisdom's openness and transparency, and the "stealth and secrecy and darkness" which had shrouded the harlot's enticements in chapter 7.

=== Verse 9 ===
They are all plain to him who understands,

and right to those who find knowledge.

- "Plain": literally in Hebrew "front of", that is "right in front of" someone.

== Wisdom's second invitation (verses 10–21) ==
The second invitation in verses 10–11 is very similar to the appeal in Proverbs:14–15, whereas verses 12–14 recall the words of the prologue of the book (Proverbs 1:2–7). In the explanation following the invitation, Wisdom describes her 'providential role in the good and orderly government of the world' (verses 12–16) and 'as the giver of wealth' (verses 17–21).

== Wisdom's hymn (verses 22–31) ==
The third invitation is preceded by a hymn of self-praise in two parts by Wisdom (verses 22–31):

1. Wisdom's origins before creation (verses 22–26), and
2. Wisdom's place at creation (verses 27–31).

Wisdom describes herself as:

- created or possessed by God (verse 22), from the Hebrew word qanah meaning "create", as in Genesis 14:19, 22, or "procreate”, as in Genesis 4:1, or "establish" or "possess": translation of this word has been "a battleground of controversy since the days of the Arian heresy";
- setup or installed (verse 23); with royal overtones, cf. Psalm 2:6; may relate to a root meaning 'to be fashioned [in the womb]' (cf. Job 10:11; Psalm 139:13).
- born (verses 24–25); consistently representing herself as a child of God.

=== Verse 31 ===
rejoicing in the habitable part of His earth,

and my delights were with the sons of men.

- "In the habitable part of His earth": from Hebrew בתבל ארצו, bə-ṯê-ḇêl ’ar-tṣōw; using two synonymous words to express a superlative idea—the “whole world” (cf. NIV, NCV).

== Wisdom's third invitation (verses 32–36) ==
Verses 32–36 form a conclusion referring back to verses 3–4.

== See also ==
- Blessing
- Divine judgment
- Evil
- Genesis creation narrative
- Hubris
- Pride
- Righteousness
- Sexual ethics
- Sheol
- Sin
- Soul
- Truth
- Understanding
- Wickedness
- Wisdom
- YHWH
- Related Bible parts: Proverbs 1, Proverbs 2, Proverbs 7, Proverbs 9

== Sources ==
- Aitken, K. T. (2007). "19. Proverbs". In Barton, John; Muddiman, John (eds.). The Oxford Bible Commentary (1st, pbk. ed.). Oxford University Press. pp. 405–22. ISBN 978-0-19927718-6.
- Alter, Robert (2010). The Wisdom Books: Job, Proverbs, and Ecclesiastes: A Translation with Commentary. W.W. Norton & Co. ISBN 978-0-39308073-5.
- Coogan, Michael David (2007). Coogan, Michael David; Brettler, Marc Zvi; Newsom, Carol Ann; Perkins, Pheme (eds.). The New Oxford Annotated Bible with the Apocryphal/Deuterocanonical Books: New Revised Standard Version, Issue 48 (augm. 3rd ed.). Oxford University Press. ISBN 978-0-19528881-0.
- Farmer, Kathleen A. (1998). "The Wisdom Books". In McKenzie, Steven L.; Graham, Matt Patrick (eds.). The Hebrew Bible Today: An Introduction to Critical Issues. Westminster John Knox Press. ISBN 978-0-66425652-4.
- Fox, Michael V. (2009). Proverbs 10–31: A New Translation with Introduction and Commentary. Anchor Yale Bible Commentaries. Yale University Press. ISBN 978-0-30015556-3.
- Halley, Henry H. (1965). Halley's Bible Handbook: an abbreviated Bible commentary (24th (rev.) ed.). Zondervan Publishing House. ISBN 0-310-25720-4.
- Perdue, Leo G. (2012). Proverbs Interpretation: A Bible Commentary for Teaching and Preaching. Presbyterian Publishing Corp. ISBN 978-0-66423884-1.
- Würthwein, Ernst (1995). The Text of the Old Testament. Translated by Rhodes, Erroll F. Grand Rapids, MI: Wm. B. Eerdmans. ISBN 0-8028-0788-7.
