= Proverbs 7 =

Seventh chapter of the biblical book of Proverbs

- ← chapter 6 chapter 8 →
- The whole Book of Proverbs in the Leningrad Codex (1008 C.E.) from an old facsimile edition.
- Book: Book of Proverbs
- Category: Ketuvim
- Christian Bible part: Old Testament
- Order in the Christian part: 21

Proverbs 7 is the seventh chapter of the Book of Proverbs in the Hebrew Bible or the Old Testament of the Christian Bible. The book is a compilation of several wisdom literature collections, with the heading in 1:1 may be intended to regard Solomon as the traditional author of the whole book, but the dates of the individual collections are difficult to determine, and the book probably obtained its final shape in the post-exilic period. This chapter is a part of the first collection of the book.

== Text ==
=== Hebrew ===
The following table shows the Hebrew text of Proverbs 7 with vowels alongside an English translation based upon the JPS 1917 translation (now in the public domain).

Verse	Hebrew	English translation (JPS 1917)
1	בְּ֭נִי שְׁמֹ֣ר אֲמָרָ֑י וּ֝מִצְוֺתַ֗י תִּצְפֹּ֥ן אִתָּֽךְ׃	My son, keep my words, And lay up my commandments with thee.
2	שְׁמֹ֣ר מִצְוֺתַ֣י וֶחְיֵ֑ה וְ֝תוֹרָתִ֗י כְּאִישׁ֥וֹן עֵינֶֽיךָ׃	Keep my commandments and live, And my teaching as the apple of thine eye.
3	קׇשְׁרֵ֥ם עַל־אֶצְבְּעֹתֶ֑יךָ כׇּ֝תְבֵ֗ם עַל־ל֥וּחַ לִבֶּֽךָ׃	Bind them upon thy fingers, Write them upon the table of thy heart.
4	אֱמֹ֣ר לַ֭חׇכְמָה אֲחֹ֣תִי אָ֑תְּ וּ֝מֹדָ֗ע לַבִּינָ֥ה תִקְרָֽא׃	Say unto wisdom: ‘Thou art my sister’, And call understanding thy kinswoman;
5	לִ֭שְׁמׇרְךָ מֵאִשָּׁ֣ה זָרָ֑ה מִ֝נׇּכְרִיָּ֗ה אֲמָרֶ֥יהָ הֶחֱלִֽיקָה׃	That they may keep thee from the strange woman, From the alien woman that maketh smooth her words.
6	כִּ֭י בְּחַלּ֣וֹן בֵּיתִ֑י בְּעַ֖ד אֶשְׁנַבִּ֣י נִשְׁקָֽפְתִּי׃	For at the window of my house I looked forth through my lattice;
7	וָאֵ֤רֶא בַפְּתָאיִ֗ם אָ֘בִ֤ינָה בַבָּנִ֗ים נַ֣עַר חֲסַר־לֵֽב׃	And I beheld among the thoughtless ones, I discerned among the youths, A young man void of understanding,
8	עֹבֵ֣ר בַּ֭שּׁוּק אֵ֣צֶל פִּנָּ֑הּ וְדֶ֖רֶךְ בֵּיתָ֣הּ יִצְעָֽד׃	Passing through the street near her corner, And he went the way to her house;
9	בְּנֶֽשֶׁף־בְּעֶ֥רֶב י֑וֹם בְּאִישׁ֥וֹן לַ֝֗יְלָה וַאֲפֵלָֽה׃	In the twilight, in the evening of the day, In the blackness of night and the darkness.
10	וְהִנֵּ֣ה אִ֭שָּׁה לִקְרָאת֑וֹ שִׁ֥ית ז֝וֹנָ֗ה וּנְצֻ֥רַת לֵֽב׃	And, behold, there met him a woman With the attire of a harlot, and wily of heart.
11	הֹמִיָּ֣ה הִ֣יא וְסֹרָ֑רֶת בְּ֝בֵיתָ֗הּ לֹא־יִשְׁכְּנ֥וּ רַגְלֶֽיהָ׃	She is riotous and rebellious, Her feet abide not in her house;
12	פַּ֤עַם ׀ בַּח֗וּץ פַּ֥עַם בָּרְחֹב֑וֹת וְאֵ֖צֶל כׇּל־פִּנָּ֣ה תֶאֱרֹֽב׃	Now she is in the streets, now in the broad places, And lieth in wait at every corner.
13	וְהֶחֱזִ֣יקָה בּ֭וֹ וְנָ֣שְׁקָה לּ֑וֹ הֵעֵ֥זָה פָ֝נֶ֗יהָ וַתֹּ֣אמַר לֽוֹ׃	So she caught him, and kissed him, And with an impudent face she said unto him:
14	זִבְחֵ֣י שְׁלָמִ֣ים עָלָ֑י הַ֝יּ֗וֹם שִׁלַּ֥מְתִּי נְדָרָֽי׃	’Sacrifices of peace-offerings were due from me; This day have I paid my vows.
15	עַל־כֵּ֭ן יָצָ֣אתִי לִקְרָאתֶ֑ךָ לְשַׁחֵ֥ר פָּ֝נֶ֗יךָ וָאֶמְצָאֶֽךָּ׃	Therefore, came I forth to meet thee, To seek thy face, and I have found thee.
16	מַ֭רְבַדִּים רָבַ֣דְתִּי עַרְשִׂ֑י חֲ֝טֻב֗וֹת אֵט֥וּן מִצְרָֽיִם׃	I have decked my couch with coverlets, With striped cloths of the yarn of Egypt.
17	נַ֥פְתִּי מִשְׁכָּבִ֑י מֹ֥ר אֲ֝הָלִ֗ים וְקִנָּמֽוֹן׃	I have perfumed my bed With myrrh, aloes, and cinnamon.
18	לְכָ֤ה נִרְוֶ֣ה דֹ֭דִים עַד־הַבֹּ֑קֶר נִ֝תְעַלְּסָ֗ה בׇּאֳהָבִֽים׃	Come, let us take our fill of love until the morning; Let us solace ourselves with loves.
19	כִּ֤י אֵ֣ין הָאִ֣ישׁ בְּבֵית֑וֹ הָ֝לַ֗ךְ בְּדֶ֣רֶךְ מֵרָחֽוֹק׃	For my husband is not at home, He is gone a long journey;
20	צְֽרוֹר־הַ֭כֶּסֶף לָקַ֣ח בְּיָד֑וֹ לְי֥וֹם הַ֝כֵּ֗סֶא יָבֹ֥א בֵיתֽוֹ׃	He hath taken the bag of money with him; He will come home at the full moon.’
21	הִ֭טַּתּוּ בְּרֹ֣ב לִקְחָ֑הּ בְּחֵ֥לֶק שְׂ֝פָתֶ֗יהָ תַּדִּיחֶֽנּוּ׃	With her much fair speech she causeth him to yield, With the blandishment of her lips she enticeth him away.
22	ה֤וֹלֵ֥ךְ אַחֲרֶ֗יהָ פִּ֫תְאֹ֥ם כְּ֭שׁוֹר אֶל־טֶ֣בַח יָבֹ֑א וּ֝כְעֶ֗כֶס אֶל־מוּסַ֥ר אֱוִֽיל׃	He goeth after her straightway, As an ox that goeth to the slaughter, Or as one in fetters to the correction of the fool;
23	עַ֤ד יְפַלַּ֪ח חֵ֡ץ כְּֽבֵד֗וֹ כְּמַהֵ֣ר צִפּ֣וֹר אֶל־פָּ֑ח וְלֹא־יָ֝דַ֗ע כִּֽי־בְנַפְשׁ֥וֹ הֽוּא׃	Till an arrow strike through his liver; As a bird hasteneth to the snare— And knoweth not that it is at the cost of his life.
24	וְעַתָּ֣ה בָ֭נִים שִׁמְעוּ־לִ֑י וְ֝הַקְשִׁ֗יבוּ לְאִמְרֵי־פִֽי׃	Now therefore, O ye children, hearken unto me, And attend to the words of my mouth.
25	אַל־יֵ֣שְׂטְ אֶל־דְּרָכֶ֣יהָ לִבֶּ֑ךָ אַל־תֵּ֝֗תַע בִּנְתִיבוֹתֶֽיהָ׃	Let not thy heart decline to her ways, Go not astray in her paths.
26	כִּֽי־רַבִּ֣ים חֲלָלִ֣ים הִפִּ֑ילָה וַ֝עֲצֻמִ֗ים כׇּל־הֲרֻגֶֽיהָ׃	For she hath cast down many wounded; Yea, a mighty host are all her slain.
27	דַּרְכֵ֣י שְׁא֣וֹל בֵּיתָ֑הּ יֹ֝רְד֗וֹת אֶל־חַדְרֵי־מָֽוֶת׃	Her house is the way to the nether-world, Going down to the chambers of death.

=== Textual witnesses ===
Some early manuscripts containing the text of this chapter in Hebrew are of the Masoretic Text, which includes the Aleppo Codex (10th century), and Codex Leningradensis (1008). Fragments containing parts of this chapter in Hebrew were found among the Dead Sea Scrolls including 4Q103 (4QProv^{b}; 30 BCE – 30 CE) with extant verses 9, 11.

There is also a translation into Koine Greek known as the Septuagint, made in the last few centuries BC; some extant ancient manuscripts of this version include Codex Vaticanus (B; $\mathfrak{G}$^{B}; 4th century), Codex Sinaiticus (S; BHK: $\mathfrak{G}$^{S}; 4th century), and Codex Alexandrinus (A; $\mathfrak{G}$^{A}; 5th century).

== Analysis ==
This chapter belongs to a section regarded as the first collection in the book of Proverbs (comprising Proverbs 1–9), known as "Didactic discourses". The Jerusalem Bible describes chapters 1–9 as a prologue of the chapters 10–22:16, the so-called "[actual] proverbs of Solomon", as "the body of the book". The chapter has the following structure:

- Parental instruction to accept teaching against the wiles of the harlot (adulteress) (verses 1–5)
- Example story on the wiles of the harlot (verses 6–23)
- Concluding instruction to avoid the harlot (verses 24–27)

== The wiles of a harlot (7:1–5) ==
The appeal for the son to accept the instruction in this section closely echoes 6:20–24. Wisdom is to be treated as a 'sister' (verse 4; cf. a 'bride' in Song 4:9–10), to counter the attraction to the adulteress (cf. Proverbs 4:6–9). It is followed by a story presented in the form of the personal reminiscence of the narrator.

=== Verse 2 ===
Keep my commandments and live,
and my teaching as the apple of your eye.

- "Apple of my eye": from a Hebrew phrase that refers to "the pupil of the eye"; perhaps by the idiom “the little man in [the] eye", because the word אִישׁוֹן, ʾishon, "pupil", seems to be a diminutive from אִישׁ, ʾish, "man". This phrase is found in several other places in the Hebrew Bible (Deuteronomy 32:10, Psalm 17:8, Zechariah 2:8). The phrase "has the idea of something precious that was to be guarded jealously", because of the importance of protecting the eye from harm, and can be rendered in a more contemporary wording to be "as your most prized possession."

== The crafty harlot (7:6–27) ==
This section records "an example story on the wiles of the adulteress ... cast in the form of [a] personal reminiscence". The narrator observes a wayward youth through the lattice of his window (in the Septuagint, it is the woman who looks out of the window seeking her prey). This young man was going through darkening streets towards the house of the adulteress (verses 6–9) and there he is accosted by the woman who dressed like a prostitute (verses 10–13) and spoke with 'smoothness' (verses 14–20; cf. verse 5)—the harlot's chief weapon (cf. Proverbs 2:16; 5:3; 6:24). Unable to resist the advances and oblivious to the real cost to pay, the young man follows the harlot like a beast to the slaughter, or a bird caught in her snare (verses 21–23). The final paragraph (verses 24–27) reinforces the instruction to avoid the deadly paths of the adulteress or harlot, because her house is "the vestibule to Sheol and leads down to death" (cf. Proverbs 2:18–19; 5:8).

== See also ==
- Ancient Egypt
- Earth
- Evil
- Harlot
- Longevity
- Mercy
- Mitzvah
- Prostitution
- Sexual ethics
- Sheol
- Understanding
- Wisdom
- YHWH
- Related Bible parts: Proverbs 1, Proverbs 2, Proverbs 6, Proverbs 15

== General and cited sources ==
- Aitken, K. T. (2007). "19. Proverbs". In Barton, John; Muddiman, John (eds.). The Oxford Bible Commentary (1st (paperback) ed.). Oxford University Press. pp. 405–22. ISBN 978-0-19927718-6.
- Alter, Robert (2010). The Wisdom Books: Job, Proverbs, and Ecclesiastes: A Translation with Commentary. W.W. Norton & Co. ISBN 978-0-39308073-5.
- Coogan, Michael David (2007). Coogan, Michael David; Brettler, Marc Zvi; Newsom, Carol Ann; Perkins, Pheme (eds.). The New Oxford Annotated Bible with the Apocryphal/Deuterocanonical Books: New Revised Standard Version, Issue 48 (Augmented 3rd ed.). Oxford University Press. ISBN 9780195288810.
- Farmer, Kathleen A. (1998). "The Wisdom Books". In McKenzie, Steven L.; Graham, Matt Patrick (eds.). The Hebrew Bible Today: An Introduction to Critical Issues. Westminster John Knox Press. ISBN 978-0-66425652-4.
- Fitzmyer, Joseph A. (2008). A Guide to the Dead Sea Scrolls and Related Literature. Grand Rapids, MI: William B. Eerdmans Publ. Co. ISBN 9780802862419.
- Fox, Michael V. (2009). Proverbs 10-31: A New Translation with Introduction and Commentary. Anchor Yale Bible Commentaries. Yale University Press. ISBN 978-0300155563.
- Halley, Henry H. (1965). Halley's Bible Handbook: an abbreviated Bible commentary (24th (rev.) ed.). Zondervan Publishing House. ISBN 0-310-25720-4.
- Perdue, Leo G. (2012). Proverbs Interpretation: A Bible Commentary for Teaching and Preaching. Presbyterian Publ. Corp. ISBN 978-0-66423884-1.
- Ulrich, Eugene, ed. (2010). The Biblical Qumran Scrolls: Transcriptions and Textual Variants. Brill.
- Würthwein, Ernst (1995). The Text of the Old Testament. Translated by Rhodes, Erroll F. Grand Rapids, MI: Wm. B. Eerdmans. ISBN 0-8028-0788-7.
