= Proverbs 1 =

First chapter of the biblical book of Proverbs

- ← Psalm 150 chapter 2 →
- The whole Book of Proverbs in the Leningrad Codex (1008 C.E.) from an old facsimile edition.
- Book: Book of Proverbs
- Category: Ketuvim
- Christian Bible part: Old Testament
- Order in the Christian part: 21

Proverbs 1 is the first chapter of the Book of Proverbs in the Hebrew Bible or the Old Testament of the Christian Bible. The book is a compilation of several wisdom literature collections, with the heading in 1:1 may be intended to regard Solomon as the traditional author of the whole book, but the dates of the individual collections are difficult to determine, and the book probably obtained its final shape in the post-exilic period. This chapter is a part of the first collection of the book.

== Text ==
=== Hebrew ===
The following table shows the Hebrew text of Proverbs 1 with vowels alongside an English translation based upon the JPS 1917 translation (now in the public domain).

Verse	Hebrew	English translation (JPS 1917)
1	מִ֭שְׁלֵי שְׁלֹמֹ֣ה בֶן־דָּוִ֑ד מֶ֝֗לֶךְ יִשְׂרָאֵֽל׃	The proverbs of Solomon the son of David, king of Israel;
2	לָדַ֣עַת חׇכְמָ֣ה וּמוּסָ֑ר לְ֝הָבִ֗ין אִמְרֵ֥י בִינָֽה׃	To know wisdom and instruction; To comprehend the words of understanding;
3	לָ֭קַחַת מוּסַ֣ר הַשְׂכֵּ֑ל צֶ֥דֶק וּ֝מִשְׁפָּ֗ט וּמֵשָׁרִֽים׃	To receive the discipline of wisdom, Justice, and right, and equity;
4	לָתֵ֣ת לִפְתָאיִ֣ם עׇרְמָ֑ה לְ֝נַ֗עַר דַּ֣עַת וּמְזִמָּֽה׃	To give prudence to the simple, To the young man knowledge and discretion;
5	יִשְׁמַ֣ע חָ֭כָם וְי֣וֹסֶף לֶ֑קַח וְ֝נָב֗וֹן תַּחְבֻּל֥וֹת יִקְנֶֽה׃	That the wise man may hear, and increase in learning, And the man of understanding may attain unto wise counsels;
6	לְהָבִ֣ין מָ֭שָׁל וּמְלִיצָ֑ה דִּבְרֵ֥י חֲ֝כָמִ֗ים וְחִידֹתָֽם׃	To understand a proverb, and a figure; The words of the wise, and their dark sayings.
7	יִרְאַ֣ת יְ֭הֹוָה רֵאשִׁ֣ית דָּ֑עַת חׇכְמָ֥ה וּ֝מוּסָ֗ר אֱוִילִ֥ים בָּֽזוּ׃	The fear of the LORD is the beginning of knowledge; But the foolish despise wisdom and discipline.
8	שְׁמַ֣ע בְּ֭נִי מוּסַ֣ר אָבִ֑יךָ וְאַל־תִּ֝טֹּ֗שׁ תּוֹרַ֥ת אִמֶּֽךָ׃	Hear, my son, the instruction of thy father, And forsake not the teaching of thy mother;
9	כִּ֤י ׀ לִוְיַ֤ת חֵ֓ן הֵ֬ם לְרֹאשֶׁ֑ךָ וַ֝עֲנָקִ֗ים לְגַרְגְּרֹתֶֽךָ׃	For they shall be a chaplet of grace unto thy head, And chains about thy neck.
10	בְּנִ֡י אִם־יְפַתּ֥וּךָ חַ֝טָּאִ֗ים אַל־תֹּבֵֽא׃	My son, if sinners entice thee, Consent thou not.
11	אִם־יֹאמְרוּ֮ לְכָ֢ה אִ֫תָּ֥נוּ נֶאֶרְבָ֥ה לְדָ֑ם נִצְפְּנָ֖ה לְנָקִ֣י חִנָּֽם׃	If they say: 'Come with us, Let us lie in wait for blood, Let us lurk for the innocent without cause;
12	נִ֭בְלָעֵם כִּשְׁא֣וֹל חַיִּ֑ים וּ֝תְמִימִ֗ים כְּי֣וֹרְדֵי בֽוֹר׃	Let us swallow them up alive as the grave, and whole, as those that go down into the pit;
13	כׇּל־ה֣וֹן יָקָ֣ר נִמְצָ֑א נְמַלֵּ֖א בָתֵּ֣ינוּ שָׁלָֽל׃	We shall find all precious substance, We shall fill our houses with spoil;
14	גּ֭וֹרָ֣לְךָ תַּפִּ֣יל בְּתוֹכֵ֑נוּ כִּ֥יס אֶ֝חָ֗ד יִהְיֶ֥ה לְכֻלָּֽנוּ׃	Cast in thy lot among us; Let us all have one purse'—
15	בְּנִ֗י אַל־תֵּלֵ֣ךְ בְּדֶ֣רֶךְ אִתָּ֑ם מְנַ֥ע רַ֝גְלְךָ֗ מִנְּתִיבָתָֽם׃	My son, walk not thou in the way with them, restrain thy foot from their path;
16	כִּ֣י רַ֭גְלֵיהֶם לָרַ֣ע יָר֑וּצוּ וִ֝ימַהֲר֗וּ לִשְׁפׇּךְ־דָּֽם׃	For their feet run to evil, and they make haste to shed blood.
17	כִּֽי־חִ֭נָּם מְזֹרָ֣ה הָרָ֑שֶׁת בְּ֝עֵינֵ֗י כׇּל־בַּ֥עַל כָּנָֽף׃	For in vain the net is spread in the eyes of any bird;
18	וְ֭הֵם לְדָמָ֣ם יֶאֱרֹ֑בוּ יִ֝צְפְּנ֗וּ לְנַפְשֹׁתָֽם׃	And these lie in wait for their own blood, they lurk for their own lives.
19	כֵּ֗ן אׇ֭רְחוֹת כׇּל־בֹּ֣צֵֽעַ בָּ֑צַע אֶת־נֶ֖פֶשׁ בְּעָלָ֣יו יִקָּֽח׃	So are the ways of every one that is greedy of gain; it taketh away the life of the owners thereof.
20	חׇ֭כְמוֹת בַּח֣וּץ תָּרֹ֑נָּה בָּ֝רְחֹב֗וֹת תִּתֵּ֥ן קוֹלָֽהּ׃	Wisdom crieth aloud in the streets, she uttereth her voice in the broad places;
21	בְּרֹ֥אשׁ הֹמִיּ֗וֹת תִּ֫קְרָ֥א בְּפִתְחֵ֖י שְׁעָרִ֥ים בָּעִ֗יר אֲמָרֶ֥יהָ תֹאמֵֽר׃	She calleth at the head of the noisy streets, at the entrances of the gates, in the city, she uttereth her words:
22	עַד־מָתַ֣י ׀ פְּתָיִם֮ תְּֽאֵהֲב֫וּ־פֶ֥תִי וְלֵצִ֗ים לָ֭צוֹן חָמְד֣וּ לָהֶ֑ם וּ֝כְסִילִ֗ים יִשְׂנְאוּ־דָֽעַת׃	'How long, ye thoughtless, will ye love thoughtlessness? And how long will scorners delight them in scorning, And fools hate knowledge?
23	תָּשׁ֗וּבוּ לְֽת֫וֹכַחְתִּ֥י הִנֵּ֤ה אַבִּ֣יעָה לָכֶ֣ם רוּחִ֑י אוֹדִ֖יעָה דְבָרַ֣י אֶתְכֶֽם׃	Turn you at my reproof; behold, I will pour out my spirit unto you, I will make known my words unto you.
24	יַ֣עַן קָ֭רָאתִי וַתְּמָאֵ֑נוּ נָטִ֥יתִי יָ֝דִ֗י וְאֵ֣ין מַקְשִֽׁיב׃	Because I have called, and ye refused, I have stretched out my hand, and no man attended,
25	וַתִּפְרְע֥וּ כׇל־עֲצָתִ֑י וְ֝תוֹכַחְתִּ֗י לֹ֣א אֲבִיתֶֽם׃	But ye have set at nought all my counsel, and would none of my reproof;
26	גַּם־אֲ֭נִי בְּאֵידְכֶ֣ם אֶשְׂחָ֑ק אֶ֝לְעַ֗ג בְּבֹ֣א פַחְדְּכֶֽם׃	I also, in your calamity, will laugh, I will mock when your dread cometh;
27	בְּבֹ֤א (כשאוה) [כְשׁוֹאָ֨ה ׀] פַּחְדְּכֶ֗ם וְֽ֭אֵידְכֶם כְּסוּפָ֣ה יֶאֱתֶ֑ה בְּבֹ֥א עֲ֝לֵיכֶ֗ם צָרָ֥ה וְצוּקָֽה׃	When your dread cometh as a storm, and your calamity cometh on as a whirlwind; When trouble and distress come upon you.
28	אָ֣ז יִ֭קְרָאֻנְנִי וְלֹ֣א אֶעֱנֶ֑ה יְ֝שַׁחֲרֻ֗נְנִי וְלֹ֣א יִמְצָאֻֽנְנִי׃	Then will they call me, but I will not answer, they will seek me earnestly, but they shall not find me.
29	תַּ֭חַת כִּֽי־שָׂ֣נְאוּ דָ֑עַת וְיִרְאַ֥ת יְ֝הֹוָ֗ה לֹ֣א בָחָֽרוּ׃	For that they hated knowledge, and did not choose the fear of the LORD;
30	לֹא־אָב֥וּ לַעֲצָתִ֑י נָ֝אֲצ֗וּ כׇּל־תּוֹכַחְתִּֽי׃	They would none of my counsel, they despised all my reproof.
31	וְֽ֭יֹאכְלוּ מִפְּרִ֣י דַרְכָּ֑ם וּֽמִמֹּעֲצֹ֖תֵיהֶ֣ם יִשְׂבָּֽעוּ׃	Therefore, shall they eat of the fruit of their own way, and be filled with their own devices.
32	כִּ֤י מְשׁוּבַ֣ת פְּתָיִ֣ם תַּהַרְגֵ֑ם וְשַׁלְוַ֖ת כְּסִילִ֣ים תְּאַבְּדֵֽם׃	For the waywardness of the thoughtless shall slay them, and the confidence of fools shall destroy them.
33	וְשֹׁמֵ֣עַֽ לִ֭י יִשְׁכׇּן־בֶּ֑טַח וְ֝שַׁאֲנַ֗ן מִפַּ֥חַד רָעָֽה׃	But whoso hearkeneth unto me shall dwell securely, and shall be quiet without fear of evil.'

=== Textual witnesses ===
Some early manuscripts containing the text of this chapter in Hebrew are of the Masoretic Text, which includes the Aleppo Codex (10th century), and Codex Leningradensis (1008). Fragments containing parts of this chapter in Hebrew were found among the Dead Sea Scrolls including 4Q102 (4QProv^{a}; 30 BCE – 30 CE) with extant verses 27–33.

There is also a translation into Koine Greek known as the Septuagint, made in the last few centuries BCE; some extant ancient manuscripts of this version include Codex Vaticanus (B; $\mathfrak{G}$^{B}; 4th century), Codex Sinaiticus (S; BHK: $\mathfrak{G}$^{S}; 4th century), and Codex Alexandrinus (A; $\mathfrak{G}$^{A}; 5th century).

== Analysis ==
This chapter opens a section regarded as the first collection in the book of Proverbs (comprising Proverbs 1–9), known as "Didactic discourses". The Jerusalem Bible describes chapters 1–9 as a prologue of the chapters 10–22:16, the so-called "[actual] proverbs of Solomon", as "the body of the book". The chapter has the following structure:

- Introduction (1:1–7)
- Avoid Evil Men (1:8–19)
- Wisdom's First Speech (1:20–33)

== Introduction (1:1–7) ==
This section outlines the purpose and value of the book as a whole, especially the basis of its teachings. The five purpose clauses of the collection of proverbs in general are listed in verses 1:2a, 2b, 3a, 4a, 6a of the opening section.

=== Verse 1 ===
The proverbs of Solomon, son of David, king of Israel:

— Proverbs 1:1, English Standard Version

- "Proverb": from the Hebrew noun מָשָׁל, mashal, can refer to "an object lesson based on or using a comparison or analogy"; "a short pithy statement" (Ezekiel 16:44); an "object lesson drawn from experience" (Psalm 78:2–6); "saying or by-word" (Deuteronomy 28:37); or "an oracle of future blessing" (Ezekiel 21:1–5).
- "The Proverbs of Solomon" (מִשְׁלֵי שְׁלֹמֹה, Mishlê Šelōmōh): a phrase that is considered the title for the entire book. It does not mean that Solomon authored or collected all the proverbs in this book, though, as some sections are collections bearing the names different authors, such as the "sayings of the wise" (Proverbs 22:17–24:22), "more sayings of the wise" (Proverbs 24:23–34), "the words of Agur" (Proverbs 30:1–33) and "the words of Lemuel" (Proverbs 31:1–9). The book might not have been in its final canonical form in the days of Solomon, as there is a note in it that "the men of Hezekiah" added a collection of Solomonic proverbs to the existing form of the book (Proverbs 25:1–29:27).

=== Verse 2 ===
To know wisdom and instruction; to perceive the words of understanding;

— Proverbs 1:2, King James Version

- "To know": from the Hebrew stative verb יָדַע, yadaʿ, which can mean "to come to know" or "to become wise in".
- "Wisdom": from the Hebrew noun חָכְמָה, ḥoḵmâ, which means "skill" or "ability" and could be nuanced "moral skill." The term refers to "skill" that produces something of value, such as the manual skills of craftsmen (Exodus 31:6; 35:35; cf. Isaiah 40:20), the navigational skills of sailors (Psalm 107:27; Ezekiel 27:8), abilities of weavers (Exodus 35:26), or capabilities of administrators (1 Kings 3:28). Deuteronomy 4:6, for example, refers to the statutes and laws given by God as Israel's wisdom. To learn about wisdom means 'to become equipped with the skills necessary to live a good and successful life'.
- "Instruction": The noun מוּסָר, mûsār, which has a three-fold range of meaning: (1) physical or parental: "discipline; chastisement" (including that from God) (2) verbal: "warning; exhortation" and (3) moral: "training; instruction", such as received under the authority of a parent or teacher (cf. Proverbs 4:1–5). This term is paired with "wisdom" (ḥoḵmâ) four times in the book (Proverbs 1:2, 7; 15:33, 23:23).

=== Verse 7 ===
The fear of the Lord is the beginning of knowledge: but fools despise wisdom and instruction.

— Proverbs 1:7, King James Version

- "Fear of the LORD": from the Hebrew phrase יִרְאַת יְהוָה, yirʾat YHWH, with "YHWH" ("the Eternal") in the form of objective genitive, as the object of "fear and wonder". This expression embraces both reverence for God (cf. Isaiah 8:13) and obedience to him (cf. Deuteronomy 10:12–13; Ecclesiastes 12:13); stated here as the prerequisite of true wisdom with a repetition in 9:10 as a literary inclusion for the section comprising Proverbs 1–9, forming a central theme of the book.
- "Fear": from the Hebrew term יִרְאָה, yirʾah, originated from the root יָרֵא, yārēʾ, which has a three-fold range of meanings: (1) "be in dread or terror" (Deuteronomy 1:29; Jonah 1:10), (2) "to stand in awe" (1 Kings 3:28), (3) "to revere; to respect" (Leviticus 19:3); all of these appear in Exodus 20:20.
- "Beginning" may imply first in order (Genesis 1:1; Psalm 111:10; Proverbs 17:14; Micah 1:13), or importance (Proverbs 4:7; Amos 6:1), or the "best part" (Amos 6:6).

== Avoiding evil men (1:8–19) ==
This section contains the first of several instructions by "a father to his son" throughout the book of Proverbs. The characteristics of these instructions are:

- an appeal for attentiveness (cf. verse 8);
- the directive expressed as a command or prohibition (cf. verses 10b, 15), and
- motivation clauses to heed the directive (cf. verses 9, 16–19).

In contrast to the common practice in the wisdom schools of Egypt and Babylonia, which has a similar setting of instruction by a teacher to the pupils, the parallelism between father and mother (cf. verse 8) indicates that the instructions in the book of Proverbs may have a less formal setting of parental instruction at home. Although bearing constant reminders of parental authority, the motivation clauses appeal more to one's good sense than a duty to obey the parents.

=== Verse 8 ===
My son, hear the instruction of your father,
And do not forsake the law of your mother.

This form of appeal, My son, "is continually repeated throughout these opening chapters". The medieval French rabbi Rashi suggested that the "father" refers to God, the father of mankind, and the "instruction" or "discipline" meant the law which God "gave Moses in writing and orally". Likewise, he suggested that "mother" refers to "your nation, the nation of Israel". Theologian John Gill challenges this:

This is not to be understood of God the Father of mankind, and of that law which he has given them, as Jarchi (Rashi) and Gersom (Note: Probably Gershom ben Judah, c. 960–1040) interpret it, but of Solomon and his son in a literal sense; and of anyone that came to him for instruction, any pupil, hearer, or reader of his; and it is a direction to all children to hearken to the instruction of their parents, and obey their commands.

== Wisdom's first speech (1:20–33) ==
In this passage Wisdom is personified as a woman, who speaks with a divine authority (the basis of this authority is explained in Proverbs 8:22-31). Rejecting Wisdom would mean rejecting "the fear of the Lord" (verse 29), and is reproached with a language in close parallel to prophetic indictments (cf. Isaiah 65:1–2,12; Jeremiah 6:19). On the other hand, those who take heed to Wisdom would enjoy security and peace of mind enjoyed by those who pay heed to Wisdom (verse 33; cf. Proverbs 3:21–26).

== See also ==
- Blessing
- Divine judgment
- Divine providence
- Earth
- Evil
- Heaven
- Longevity
- Mercy
- Mitzvah
- Peace
- Righteousness
- Wisdom
- YHWH
- Related Bible parts: Proverbs 2, Proverbs 3, Proverbs 9, Proverbs 15

== Sources ==
- Aitken, K. T. (2007). "19. Proverbs". In Barton, John; Muddiman, John (eds.). The Oxford Bible Commentary (first (paperback) ed.). Oxford University Press. pp. 405–422. ISBN 978-0199277186.
- Alter, Robert (2010). The Wisdom Books: Job, Proverbs, and Ecclesiastes: A Translation with Commentary. W.W. Norton & Co. ISBN 978-0393080735.
- Coogan, Michael David (2007). Coogan, Michael David; Brettler, Marc Zvi; Newsom, Carol Ann; Perkins, Pheme (eds.). The New Oxford Annotated Bible with the Apocryphal/Deuterocanonical Books: New Revised Standard Version, Issue 48 (Augmented 3rd ed.). Oxford University Press. ISBN 9780195288810.
- Farmer, Kathleen A. (1998). "The Wisdom Books". In McKenzie, Steven L.; Graham, Matt Patrick (eds.). The Hebrew Bible Today: An Introduction to Critical Issues. Westminster John Knox Press. ISBN 978-0-66425652-4.
- Fitzmyer, Joseph A. (2008). A Guide to the Dead Sea Scrolls and Related Literature. Grand Rapids, MI: William B. Eerdmans Publishing Company. ISBN 9780802862419.
- Fox, Michael V. (2009). Proverbs 10-31: A New Translation with Introduction and Commentary. Anchor Yale Bible Commentaries. Yale University Press. ISBN 978-0300155563.
- Halley, Henry H. (1965). Halley's Bible Handbook: an abbreviated Bible commentary (24th (revised) ed.). Zondervan Publishing House. ISBN 0-310-25720-4.
- Perdue, Leo G. (2012). Proverbs Interpretation: A Bible Commentary for Teaching and Preaching. Presbyterian Publishing Corporation. ISBN 978-0664238841.
- Ulrich, Eugene, ed. (2010). The Biblical Qumran Scrolls: Transcriptions and Textual Variants. Brill.
- Würthwein, Ernst (1995). The Text of the Old Testament. Translated by Rhodes, Erroll F. Grand Rapids, MI: Wm. B. Eerdmans. ISBN 0-8028-0788-7.
