= Proverbs 2 =

Second chapter of the biblical book of Proverbs

- ← chapter 1 chapter 3 →
- The whole Book of Proverbs in the Leningrad Codex (1008 C.E.) from an old facsimile edition.
- Book: Book of Proverbs
- Category: Ketuvim
- Christian Bible part: Old Testament
- Order in the Christian part: 21

Proverbs 2 is the second chapter of the Book of Proverbs in the Hebrew Bible or the Old Testament of the Christian Bible. The book is a compilation of several wisdom literature collections, with the heading in 1:1 may be intended to regard Solomon as the traditional author of the whole book, but the dates of the individual collections are difficult to determine, and the book probably obtained its final shape in the post-exilic period. This chapter is a part of the first collection of the book.

== Text ==
=== Hebrew ===
The following table shows the Hebrew text of Proverbs 2 with vowels alongside an English translation based upon the JPS 1917 translation (now in the public domain).

Verse	Hebrew	English translation (JPS 1917)
1	בְּ֭נִי אִם־תִּקַּ֣ח אֲמָרָ֑י וּ֝מִצְוֺתַ֗י תִּצְפֹּ֥ן אִתָּֽךְ׃	My son, if thou wilt receive my words, And lay up my commandments with thee;
2	לְהַקְשִׁ֣יב לַחׇכְמָ֣ה אׇזְנֶ֑ךָ תַּטֶּ֥ה לִ֝בְּךָ֗ לַתְּבוּנָֽה׃	So that thou make thine ear attend unto wisdom, And thy heart incline to discernment;
3	כִּ֤י אִ֣ם לַבִּינָ֣ה תִקְרָ֑א לַ֝תְּבוּנָ֗ה תִּתֵּ֥ן קוֹלֶֽךָ׃	Yea, if thou call for understanding, And lift up thy voice for discernment;
4	אִם־תְּבַקְשֶׁ֥נָּה כַכָּ֑סֶף וְֽכַמַּטְמוֹנִ֥ים תַּחְפְּשֶֽׂנָּה׃	If thou seek her as silver, And search for her as for hid treasures;
5	אָ֗ז תָּ֭בִין יִרְאַ֣ת יְהֹוָ֑ה וְדַ֖עַת אֱלֹהִ֣ים תִּמְצָֽא׃	Then shalt thou understand the fear of the LORD, And find the knowledge of God.
6	כִּֽי־יְ֭הֹוָה יִתֵּ֣ן חׇכְמָ֑ה מִ֝פִּ֗יו דַּ֣עַת וּתְבוּנָֽה׃	For the LORD giveth wisdom, Out of His mouth cometh knowledge and discernment;
7	(וצפן) [יִצְפֹּ֣ן] לַ֭יְשָׁרִים תּוּשִׁיָּ֑ה מָ֝גֵ֗ן לְהֹ֣לְכֵי תֹֽם׃	He layeth up sound wisdom for the upright, He is a shield to them that walk in integrity;
8	לִ֭נְצֹר אׇרְח֣וֹת מִשְׁפָּ֑ט וְדֶ֖רֶךְ חֲסִידָ֣ו יִשְׁמֹֽר׃	That He may guard the paths of justice, And preserve the way of His godly ones. .
9	אָ֗ז תָּ֭בִין צֶ֣דֶק וּמִשְׁפָּ֑ט וּ֝מֵישָׁרִ֗ים כׇּל־מַעְגַּל־טֽוֹב׃	Then shalt thou understand righteousness and justice, And equity, yea, every good path.
10	כִּֽי־תָב֣וֹא חׇכְמָ֣ה בְלִבֶּ֑ךָ וְ֝דַ֗עַת לְֽנַפְשְׁךָ֥ יִנְעָֽם׃	For wisdom shall enter into thy heart, And knowledge shall be pleasant unto thy soul;
11	מְ֭זִמָּה תִּשְׁמֹ֥ר עָלֶ֗יךָ תְּבוּנָ֥ה תִנְצְרֶֽכָּה׃	Discretion shall watch over thee, Discernment shall guard thee;
12	לְ֭הַצִּ֣ילְךָ מִדֶּ֣רֶךְ רָ֑ע מֵ֝אִ֗ישׁ מְדַבֵּ֥ר תַּהְפֻּכֽוֹת׃	To deliver thee from the way of evil, From the men that speak froward things;
13	הַ֭עֹ֣זְבִים אׇרְח֣וֹת יֹ֑שֶׁר לָ֝לֶ֗כֶת בְּדַרְכֵי־חֹֽשֶׁךְ׃	Who leave the paths of uprightness, To walk in the ways of darkness;
14	הַ֭שְּׂמֵחִים לַעֲשׂ֥וֹת רָ֑ע יָ֝גִ֗ילוּ בְּֽתַהְפֻּכ֥וֹת רָֽע׃	Who rejoice to do evil, And delight in the frowardness of evil;
15	אֲשֶׁ֣ר אׇרְחֹתֵיהֶ֣ם עִקְּשִׁ֑ים וּ֝נְלוֹזִ֗ים בְּמַעְגְּלוֹתָֽם׃	Who are crooked in their ways, And perverse in their paths;
16	לְ֭הַצִּ֣ילְךָ מֵאִשָּׁ֣ה זָרָ֑ה מִ֝נׇּכְרִיָּ֗ה אֲמָרֶ֥יהָ הֶחֱלִֽיקָה׃	To deliver thee from the strange woman, Even from the alien woman that maketh smooth her words;
17	הַֽ֭עֹזֶבֶת אַלּ֣וּף נְעוּרֶ֑יהָ וְאֶת־בְּרִ֖ית אֱלֹהֶ֣יהָ שָׁכֵֽחָה׃	That forsaketh the lord of her youth, And forgetteth the covenant of her God.
18	כִּ֤י שָׁ֣חָה אֶל־מָ֣וֶת בֵּיתָ֑הּ וְאֶל־רְ֝פָאִ֗ים מַעְגְּלֹתֶֽיהָ׃	For her house sinketh down unto death, And her paths unto the shades;
19	כׇּל־בָּ֭אֶיהָ לֹ֣א יְשׁוּב֑וּן וְלֹֽא־יַ֝שִּׂ֗יגוּ אׇרְח֥וֹת חַיִּֽים׃	None that go unto her return, Neither do they attain unto the paths of life;
20	לְמַ֗עַן תֵּ֭לֵךְ בְּדֶ֣רֶךְ טוֹבִ֑ים וְאׇרְח֖וֹת צַדִּיקִ֣ים תִּשְׁמֹֽר׃	That thou mayest walk in the way of good men, And keep the paths of the righteous.
21	כִּֽי־יְשָׁרִ֥ים יִשְׁכְּנוּ־אָ֑רֶץ וּ֝תְמִימִ֗ים יִוָּ֥תְרוּ בָֽהּ׃	For the upright shall dwell in the land, And the whole-hearted shall remain in it.
22	וּ֭רְשָׁעִים מֵאֶ֣רֶץ יִכָּרֵ֑תוּ וּ֝בוֹגְדִ֗ים יִסְּח֥וּ מִמֶּֽנָּה׃	But the wicked shall be cut off from the land, And the faithless shall be plucked up out of it.

=== Textual witnesses ===
Some early manuscripts containing the text of this chapter in Hebrew are of the Masoretic Text, which includes the Aleppo Codex (10th century), and Codex Leningradensis (1008). Fragments containing parts of this chapter in Hebrew were found among the Dead Sea Scrolls including 4Q102 (4QProv^{a}; 30 BCE – 30 CE) with extant verse 1.

There is also a translation into Koine Greek known as the Septuagint, made in the last few centuries BC. Extant ancient manuscripts of the Septuagint version include Codex Vaticanus (B; $\mathfrak{G}$^{B}; 4th century), Codex Sinaiticus (S; BHK: $\mathfrak{G}$^{S}; 4th century), and Codex Alexandrinus (A; $\mathfrak{G}$^{A}; 5th century).

== Analysis ==
This chapter belongs to a section regarded as the first collection in the book of Proverbs (comprising Proverbs 1–9), known as "Didactic discourses". The Jerusalem Bible describes chapters 1–9 as a prologue of the chapters 10–22:16, the so-called "[actual] proverbs of Solomon", as "the body of the book". The chapter starts with an admonition to receive wisdom (verses 1–4) followed by the benefits of it: *the knowledge of God and his protection (5–8),

- moral discernment for living (9–11),
- protection from evil men (12–15) and immoral women (16–19), and
- enablement for righteous living (20–22).

The instruction in this chapter presents "wisdom" as a human quest (verses 1–5) and a divine gift (verses 6–8), which guards its recipients from the way of evil men and loose women (verses 9–19), and guides them in the way of good men (verses 20–22).

== Value of Wisdom (2:1–8) ==
Wisdom is to be pursued with the attentiveness to the father's words and the inclination of the heart (or 'mind') as well as the fervent desire and perseverance (verses 1–4). The prize for getting the wisdom is worth the toil (verse 5) given by God himself (verse 6), effectively maintaining God's moral order ('paths of justice') by 'shielding' that person from the pitfalls and snares of evil (verses 7–8).

=== Verse 1 ===
My son, if you receive my words

and treasure up my commandments with you,

This verse opens one long conditional sentence comprising:

- (1) the protasis (“if…”) that runs through verse 4 and
- (2) the apodosis (“then…”) consisting of two parallel panels in verses 5-8 and verses 9–11, both of which are introduced by the particle אָז, ʾaz, “then”.
- "Treasure": from Hebrew צָפַן, tsafan, “to store up”, which takes on "the technical meaning of memorizing the commandments of God”, so one can draw on them in need or in preparation for any situations.

The verb "treasure" qualifies the term "receive", לָקַח, laqakh, in the first clause, just as “commandments” intensifies “words”. The pattern of 'intensification through parallelism' is found in verses 1 to 4.

== Benefits of Wisdom (2:9–22) ==
The description of Wisdom as a guide and a guard (verses 9–11) echoes the introduction in Proverbs 1:2–7, is applied in following verses, in particular against 'evil men' (verses 12–15) and 'loose women' (or 'sexual impurities'; verses 16–19), so it leads to the way of good persons (verses 20–22). The theme of the 'loose woman' (verses. 16–19) is developed in more details in Proverbs 5:1–14, 6:20–35, and 7:1–27.

=== Verse 16 ===
To deliver you from the adulterous woman,

from the loose woman who has flattered you with her words

- "To deliver you" is from the Hebrew word לְהַצִּילְךָ, l^{e}hatsil^{e}kha; the same term used in both verses 12 and 16 for deliverance from the evil man (verses 12–15) and the evil woman (verses 16–19), each with four poetic lines.
- "Adulterous woman", in Hebrew literally "strange woman" (KJV), is from the root זוּר, zur, "to be a stranger", which refers to people 'who are ethnically foreign to Israel' (Isaiah 1:7; Hosea 7:9; 8:7) or "who are morally estranged from God or his covenant people" (Psalm 58:4; 78:30), in particular for a woman, it means "adulteress" or "prostitute" (Proverbs 2:16; 5:3, 20; 7:5; 22:14; 23:33), who may not be a foreigner but that nonetheless is estranged from or outside of the covenant community with its social and religious values.
- "Loose woman", in Hebrew literally "alien woman", is from the adjective נָכְרִי, nokhri, “foreign; alien”, which generally refer to "non-Israelite", "ethnically foreign", or "someone who is unknown or unfamiliar" though an Israelite. Here could be used as a technical term for a "harlot" or "promiscuous woman" who is 'morally alienated from God and moral society' (Proverbs 2:16; 5:20; 6:24; 7:5; 23:27) to emphasize the 'danger of being naively taken in by an unknown person.
- "Has flattered" in Hebrew is literally "has made smooth", using the Hiphil II of חָלַק, khalaq, "to be smooth; to be slippery", with the meanings:
  - (1) "to make smooth" (metal with hammer) and
  - (2) "to use smooth words", that is, to flatter (Psalm 5:10; 36:3; Proverbs 2:16; 7:5; 28:23; 29:5).

The seductive speech is compared to "olive oil" (Proverbs 5:3) and is recounted (Proverbs 7:14-20).

== See also ==
- Discretion
- Divine judgment
- Evil
- Mitzvah
- Righteousness
- Wisdom
- YHWH
- Related Bible parts: Psalm 5, Proverbs 1, Proverbs 3, Proverbs 5, Proverbs 7, Proverbs 23

== Sources ==
- Aitken, K. T. (2007). "19. Proverbs". In Barton, John; Muddiman, John (eds.). The Oxford Bible Commentary (first (paperback) ed.). Oxford University Press. pp. 405–422. ISBN 978-0199277186.
- Alter, Robert (2010). The Wisdom Books: Job, Proverbs, and Ecclesiastes: A Translation with Commentary. W.W. Norton & Co. ISBN 978-0393080735.
- Coogan, Michael David (2007). Coogan, Michael David; Brettler, Marc Zvi; Newsom, Carol Ann; Perkins, Pheme (eds.). The New Oxford Annotated Bible with the Apocryphal/Deuterocanonical Books: New Revised Standard Version, Issue 48 (Augmented 3rd ed.). Oxford University Press. ISBN 9780195288810.
- Farmer, Kathleen A. (1998). "The Wisdom Books". In McKenzie, Steven L.; Graham, Matt Patrick (eds.). The Hebrew Bible Today: An Introduction to Critical Issues. Westminster John Knox Press. ISBN 978-0-66425652-4.
- Fitzmyer, Joseph A. (2008). A Guide to the Dead Sea Scrolls and Related Literature. Grand Rapids, MI: William B. Eerdmans Publishing Company. ISBN 9780802862419.
- Fox, Michael V. (2009). Proverbs 10-31: A New Translation with Introduction and Commentary. Anchor Yale Bible Commentaries. Yale University Press. ISBN 978-0300155563.
- Halley, Henry H. (1965). Halley's Bible Handbook: an abbreviated Bible commentary (24th (revised) ed.). Zondervan Publishing House. ISBN 0-310-25720-4.
- Perdue, Leo G. (2012). Proverbs Interpretation: A Bible Commentary for Teaching and Preaching. Presbyterian Publishing Corporation. ISBN 978-0664238841.
- Ulrich, Eugene, ed. (2010). The Biblical Qumran Scrolls: Transcriptions and Textual Variants. Brill.
- Würthwein, Ernst (1995). The Text of the Old Testament. Translated by Rhodes, Erroll F. Grand Rapids, MI: Wm. B. Eerdmans. ISBN 0-8028-0788-7.
