= Proverbs 9 =

Ninth chapter of the biblical book of Proverbs

- ← chapter 8 chapter 10 →
- The whole Book of Proverbs in the Leningrad Codex (1008 C.E.) from an old facsimile edition.
- Book: Book of Proverbs
- Category: Ketuvim
- Christian Bible part: Old Testament
- Order in the Christian part: 21

Proverbs 9 is the ninth chapter of the Book of Proverbs in the Hebrew Bible or the Old Testament of the Christian Bible. The book is a compilation of several wisdom literature collections: the heading in Proverbs 1:1 may be intended to show Solomon as the traditional author of the whole book, but the dates of the individual collections are difficult to determine, and the book probably obtained its final shape in the post-exilic period. This chapter is a part of the first collection of the book.

== Text ==
=== Hebrew ===
The following table shows the Hebrew text of Proverbs 9 with vowels alongside an English translation based upon the JPS 1917 translation (now in the public domain).

Verse	Hebrew	English translation (JPS 1917)
1	חׇ֭כְמוֹת בָּנְתָ֣ה בֵיתָ֑הּ חָצְבָ֖ה עַמּוּדֶ֣יהָ שִׁבְעָֽה׃	Wisdom hath builded her house, she hath hewn out her seven pillars;
2	טָבְחָ֣ה טִ֭בְחָהּ מָסְכָ֣ה יֵינָ֑הּ אַ֝֗ף עָרְכָ֥ה שֻׁלְחָנָֽהּ׃	She hath prepared her meat, she hath mingled her wine; she hath also furnished her table.
3	שָׁלְחָ֣ה נַעֲרֹתֶ֣יהָ תִקְרָ֑א עַל־גַּ֝פֵּ֗י מְרֹ֣מֵי קָֽרֶת׃	She hath sent forth her maidens, she calleth, upon the highest places of the city:
4	מִי־פֶ֭תִי יָסֻ֣ר הֵ֑נָּה חֲסַר־לֵ֝֗ב אָ֣מְרָה לּֽוֹ׃	’Whoso is thoughtless, let him turn in hither’; as for him that lacketh understanding, she saith to him:
5	לְ֭כוּ לַחֲמ֣וּ בְֽלַחֲמִ֑י וּ֝שְׁת֗וּ בְּיַ֣יִן מָסָֽכְתִּי׃	'Come, eat of my bread, and drink of the wine which I have mingled.
6	עִזְב֣וּ פְתָאיִ֣ם וִֽחְי֑וּ וְ֝אִשְׁר֗וּ בְּדֶ֣רֶךְ בִּינָֽה׃	Forsake all thoughtlessness, and live; and walk in the way of understanding.
7	יֹ֤סֵ֨ר ׀ לֵ֗ץ לֹקֵ֣חַֽ ל֣וֹ קָל֑וֹן וּמוֹכִ֖יחַ לְרָשָׁ֣ע מוּמֽוֹ׃	He that correcteth a scorner getteth to himself shame, and he that reproveth a wicked man, it becometh unto him a blot.
8	אַל־תּ֣וֹכַח לֵ֭ץ פֶּן־יִשְׂנָאֶ֑ךָּ הוֹכַ֥ח לְ֝חָכָ֗ם וְיֶאֱהָבֶֽךָּ׃	Reprove not a scorner, lest he hate thee; reprove a wise man, and he will love thee.
9	תֵּ֣ן לְ֭חָכָם וְיֶחְכַּם־ע֑וֹד הוֹדַ֥ע לְ֝צַדִּ֗יק וְי֣וֹסֶף לֶֽקַח׃	Give to a wise man, and he will be yet wiser; teach a righteous man, and he will increase in learning.
10	תְּחִלַּ֣ת חׇ֭כְמָה יִרְאַ֣ת יְהֹוָ֑ה וְדַ֖עַת קְדֹשִׁ֣ים בִּינָֽה׃	The fear of the LORD is the beginning of wisdom, and the knowledge of the All-holy is understanding.
11	כִּי־בִ֭י יִרְבּ֣וּ יָמֶ֑יךָ וְיוֹסִ֥יפוּ לְּ֝ךָ֗ שְׁנ֣וֹת חַיִּֽים׃	For by me thy days shall be multiplied, and the years of thy life shall be increased.
12	אִם־חָ֭כַמְתָּ חָכַ֣מְתָּ לָּ֑ךְ וְ֝לַ֗צְתָּ לְֽבַדְּךָ֥ תִשָּֽׂא׃	If thou art wise, thou art wise for thyself; And if thou scornest, thou alone shalt bear it.’
13	אֵ֣שֶׁת כְּ֭סִילוּת הֹמִיָּ֑ה פְּ֝תַיּ֗וּת וּבַל־יָ֥דְעָה מָּֽה׃	The woman Folly is riotous; She is thoughtless, and knoweth nothing.
14	וְֽ֭יָשְׁבָה לְפֶ֣תַח בֵּיתָ֑הּ עַל־כִּ֝סֵּ֗א מְרֹ֣מֵי קָֽרֶת׃	And she sitteth at the door of her house, On a seat in the high places of the city,
15	לִקְרֹ֥א לְעֹֽבְרֵי־דָ֑רֶךְ הַֽ֝מְיַשְּׁרִ֗ים אֹֽרְחוֹתָֽם׃	To call to them that pass by, Who go right on their ways:
16	מִי־פֶ֭תִי יָסֻ֣ר הֵ֑נָּה וַחֲסַר־לֵ֝֗ב וְאָ֣מְרָה לּֽוֹ׃	’Whoso is thoughtless, let him turn in hither’; And as for him that lacketh understanding, she saith to him:
17	מַֽיִם־גְּנוּבִ֥ים יִמְתָּ֑קוּ וְלֶ֖חֶם סְתָרִ֣ים יִנְעָֽם׃	’Stolen waters are sweet, And bread eaten in secret is pleasant.’
18	וְֽלֹא־יָ֭דַע כִּֽי־רְפָאִ֣ים שָׁ֑ם בְּעִמְקֵ֖י שְׁא֣וֹל קְרֻאֶֽיהָ׃	But he knoweth not that the shades are there; that her guests are in the depths of the nether-world.

=== Textual witnesses ===
Some early manuscripts containing the text of this chapter in Hebrew are of the Masoretic Text, which includes the Aleppo Codex (10th century), and Codex Leningradensis (1008). Fragments containing parts of this chapter in Hebrew were found among the Dead Sea Scrolls including 4Q103a (4QProv^{c}; 30 BCE – 30 CE) with extant verses 16–17.

There is also a translation into Koine Greek known as the Septuagint, made in the last few centuries BC; some extant ancient manuscripts of this version include Codex Vaticanus (B; $\mathfrak{G}$^{B}; 4th century), Codex Sinaiticus (S; BHK: $\mathfrak{G}$^{S}; 4th century), and Codex Alexandrinus (A; $\mathfrak{G}$^{A}; 5th century).

== Analysis ==
This chapter belongs to a section regarded as the first collection in the book of Proverbs (comprising Proverbs 1–9), known as "Didactic discourses". The Jerusalem Bible describes chapters 1–9 as a prologue of the chapters 10–22:16, the so-called "[actual] proverbs of Solomon", as "the body of the book". The chapter concludes the first collection or introduction of the book by presenting the final appeals of both wisdom and folly to the 'siimpletons' or naive people in the contrasting style of rival hostesses inviting people to dine in their respective houses, where 'wisdom offers life with no mention of pleasure', whereas 'folly offers pleasure with no mention of death', with the following structure:

- Appeal to accept wisdom (9:1–12)
  - the invitation of wisdom (9:1–6)
  - the description of the responses (9:7–11)
  - the consequence (9:12)
- Appeal to accept folly (9:13–18)
  - the invitation of folly (9:13–17)
  - the consequence (9:18)

== Appeal to accept Wisdom (verses 1–12) ==
The invitation of Wisdom (verses 3–4) echoes the earlier appeals (cf. Proverbs 1:20–21; 8:1–5). It is addressed to the 'simple' or 'simpletons', that is, the people who need the most to dine with Wisdom but who can be most easily enticed to dine with Folly (cf. Proverbs 1:4). Food and drink (verse 5) figuratively describe Wisdom's instruction (cf. Isaiah 55:1–3; Sirach 15:3; 24:19–21).

=== Verse 1 ===
Wisdom has built her house,

she has hewn out her seven pillars;

The "seven pillars" may refer to 'the habitable world' (cf. Proverbs 8:31; the equation of the house and the world in Proverbs 8:29; Job 38:6; Psalm 104:5). "Seven" is regarded as 'a number for completeness and sacredness', giving the idea that wisdom produces a perfect world.

=== Verse 3 ===
She has sent out her maidens,

She cries out from the highest places of the city.

Benson says that personified Wisdom may be compared to "a great princess": therefore "it was fit she should be attended on by maidens".

=== Verses 4-5 ===
^{4} Whoever is simple, let him turn in here!

To him who lacks sense she says,

^{5} Come, eat of my bread

and drink of the wine I have mixed.

There may be an echo of this invitation in the parable of the wedding feast (Matthew 22).

== Appeal to accept Folly (verses 13–18) ==
Folly is portrayed in terms of the 'seductress', described as 'woman of foolishness' (verse 13). The brash manner in which Folly invites the simple to her house (verses 13–16) recalls the solicitations of the seductress (Proverbs 7:11–12) and contrasts with the formality and decorum of Wisdom's invitation. Whereas the banquet of Wisdom promotes and celebrates life (verse 6), to dine with Folly is to banquet with the 'dead' in Sheol (cf Proverbs 2:18–19; 5: 5–6; 7:27).

=== Verse 13 ===
A foolish woman is clamorous;

she is simple, and knows nothing.

Like Wisdom in the previous chapter, Folly is also personified as a character, called "Dame Folly" in the Jerusalem Bible, "the woman called Folly" in the New English Translation.

- In different languages, this verse is rendered as follows:
  - The Hebrew Masoretic Text reads "The foolish woman is boisterous, simplicity, and knows not what", and the Targum translates it, "a foolish woman and a gadabout, ignorant, and she knows not good."
  - The Greek Septuagint reads "A foolish and impudent woman comes to lack a morsel, she who knows not shame."
  - The Syriac version has "a woman lacking in discretion, seductive"
  - The Latin Vulgate has "a woman foolish and noisy, and full of wiles, and knowing nothing at all".
- "Clamorous": or "boisterous" or close to "riotous".
- "Simple" or "full of simpleness", from a Hebrew noun meaning “foolishness”.

== See also ==
- Earth
- Evil
- Longevity
- Mercy
- Mitzvah
- Prostitution
- Sexual ethics
- Sheol
- Understanding
- Wisdom
- YHWH
- Related Bible parts: Proverbs 1, Proverbs 2, Proverbs 7, Proverbs 8

== Sources ==
- Aitken, K. T. (2007). "19. Proverbs". In Barton, John; Muddiman, John (eds.). The Oxford Bible Commentary (first (paperback) ed.). Oxford University Press. pp. 405–422. ISBN 978-0199277186.
- Alter, Robert (2010). The Wisdom Books: Job, Proverbs, and Ecclesiastes: A Translation with Commentary. W.W. Norton & Co. ISBN 978-0393080735.
- Coogan, Michael David (2007). Coogan, Michael David; Brettler, Marc Zvi; Newsom, Carol Ann; Perkins, Pheme (eds.). The New Oxford Annotated Bible with the Apocryphal/Deuterocanonical Books: New Revised Standard Version, Issue 48 (Augmented 3rd ed.). Oxford University Press. ISBN 9780195288810.
- Farmer, Kathleen A. (1998). "The Wisdom Books". In McKenzie, Steven L.; Graham, Matt Patrick (eds.). The Hebrew Bible Today: An Introduction to Critical Issues. Westminster John Knox Press. ISBN 978-0-66425652-4.
- Fox, Michael V. (2009). Proverbs 10-31: A New Translation with Introduction and Commentary. Anchor Yale Bible Commentaries. Yale University Press. ISBN 978-0300155563.
- Halley, Henry H. (1965). Halley's Bible Handbook: an abbreviated Bible commentary (24th (revised) ed.). Zondervan Publishing House. ISBN 0-310-25720-4.
- Perdue, Leo G. (2012). Proverbs Interpretation: A Bible Commentary for Teaching and Preaching. Presbyterian Publishing Corporation. ISBN 978-0664238841.
- Ulrich, Eugene, ed. (2010). The Biblical Qumran Scrolls: Transcriptions and Textual Variants. Brill.
- Würthwein, Ernst (1995). The Text of the Old Testament. Translated by Rhodes, Erroll F. Grand Rapids, MI: Wm. B. Eerdmans. ISBN 0-8028-0788-7.
