= Michael V. Fox =

American biblical scholar (1940–2025)

- Born: 1940
- Died: January 12, 2025 (aged 84 or 85)

Academic background
- Education: University of Michigan; Hebrew Union College; Hebrew University of Jerusalem

Academic work
- Discipline: Biblical studies
- Institutions: University of Wisconsin–Madison
- Main interests: biblical wisdom literature

Michael V. Fox (1940 – 2025) was an American-Israeli biblical scholar. He was the Halls-Bascom Professor Emeritus in the Department of Hebrew and Semitic Studies at the University of Wisconsin–Madison. Fox was described as a "highly regarded authority on biblical wisdom literature."

== Education ==
From 1962 Fox holds a B.A. and from 1963 a M.A. from the University of Michigan. Fox received his rabbinical ordination from Hebrew Union College, then studied Biblical Studies and Egyptology at the Hebrew University of Jerusalem, receiving a PhD in 1972 – the first American to earn this degree at the university.

== Academic work ==
He taught in Israel for several years and in 1977 moved to Madison, Wisconsin, where he taught in the University of Wisconsin–Madison Department of Hebrew and Semitic Studies for the next 33 years (1977–2010). Named Max and Frieda Weinstein-Bascom Professor in 1991 in Jewish Studies and Halls-Bascom Professor of Hebrew in 1999, he took a sabbatical in Israel in 2006 and then taught as George Mosse Exchange Professor at the Hebrew University.

== Published works ==
A bibliographical article by L.J. Mykytiuk reviewing the publications of Michael V. Fox appeared in Fox's Festschrift.

=== Books ===
- Proverbs 1-9 (The Anchor Yale Bible Commentaries) (tree of Life)
- Proverbs 10-31 (The Anchor Yale Bible Commentaries)
- Character and Ideology in the Book of Esther Second Edition with a New Postscript on A Decade of Esther Scholarship
- Ecclesiastes: The Traditional Hebrew Text with the New JPS Translation (The Jps Bible Commentary)
- The Song of Songs and the Ancient Egyptian Love Songs
- Qoheleth and His Contradictions. Journal For The Study Of The Old Testament, Supplement Series, 71, 1989.
- A Time to Tear Down and a Time to Build Up: A Rereading of Ecclesiastes
- Proverbs. An Eclectic Edition with Introduction and Textual Commentary (in The Hebrew Bible Collection. A Critical Edition [HBCE], 2015, Atlanta, GA, U.S.A., SBL Press)

== Articles ==
Fox's articles are available at his Academia.edu profile.
