= Proverbs 26 =

Twenty-sixth chapter of the biblical book of Proverbs

- ← chapter 25 chapter 27 →
- The whole Book of Proverbs in the Leningrad Codex (1008 C.E.) from an old facsimile edition.
- Book: Book of Proverbs
- Category: Ketuvim
- Christian Bible part: Old Testament
- Order in the Christian part: 21

Proverbs 26 is the 26th chapter of the Book of Proverbs in the Hebrew Bible or the Old Testament of the Christian Bible. The book is a compilation of several wisdom literature collections, with the heading in 1:1 may be intended to regard Solomon as the traditional author of the whole book, but the dates of the individual collections are difficult to determine, and the book probably obtained its final shape in the post-exilic period. This chapter is the last part of the fifth collection of the book, so-called "the Second Solomonic Collection."

== Text ==
=== Hebrew ===
The following table shows the Hebrew text of Proverbs 26 with vowels alongside an English translation based upon the JPS 1917 translation (now in the public domain).

Verse	Hebrew	English translation (JPS 1917)
1	כַּשֶּׁ֤לֶג ׀ בַּקַּ֗יִץ וְכַמָּטָ֥ר בַּקָּצִ֑יר כֵּ֤ן לֹֽא־נָאוֶ֖ה לִכְסִ֣יל כָּבֽוֹד׃	As snow in summer, and as rain in harvest, So honour is not seemly for a fool.
2	כַּצִּפּ֣וֹר לָ֭נוּד כַּדְּר֣וֹר לָע֑וּף כֵּ֥ן קִֽלְלַ֥ת חִ֝נָּ֗ם (לא) [ל֣וֹ] תָבֹֽא׃	As the wandering sparrow, as the flying swallow, So the curse that is causeless shall come home.
3	שׁ֣וֹט לַ֭סּוּס מֶ֣תֶג לַחֲמ֑וֹר וְ֝שֵׁ֗בֶט לְגֵ֣ו כְּסִילִֽים׃	A whip for the horse, a bridle for the ass, And a rod for the back of fools.
4	אַל־תַּ֣עַן כְּ֭סִיל כְּאִוַּלְתּ֑וֹ פֶּֽן־תִּשְׁוֶה־לּ֥וֹ גַם־אָֽתָּה	Answer not a fool according to his folly, Lest thou also be like unto him.
5	עֲנֵ֣ה כְ֭סִיל כְּאִוַּלְתּ֑וֹ פֶּן־יִהְיֶ֖ה חָכָ֣ם בְּעֵינָֽיו׃	Answer a fool according to his folly, Lest he be wise in his own eyes.
6	מְקַצֶּ֣ה רַ֭גְלַיִם חָמָ֣ס שֹׁתֶ֑ה שֹׁלֵ֖חַ דְּבָרִ֣ים בְּיַד־כְּסִֽיל׃	He that sendeth a message by the hand of a fool Cutteth off his own feet, and drinketh damage
7	דַּלְי֣וּ שֹׁ֭קַיִם מִפִּסֵּ֑חַ וּ֝מָשָׁ֗ל בְּפִ֣י כְסִילִֽים׃	The legs hang limp from the lame; So is a parable in the mouth of fools.
8	כִּצְר֣וֹר אֶ֭בֶן בְּמַרְגֵּמָ֑ה כֵּן־נוֹתֵ֖ן לִכְסִ֣יל כָּבֽוֹד׃	As a small stone in a heap of stones, So is he that giveth honour to a fool.
9	ח֭וֹחַ עָלָ֣ה בְיַד־שִׁכּ֑וֹר וּ֝מָשָׁ֗ל בְּפִ֣י כְסִילִֽים׃	As a thorn that cometh into the hand of a drunkard, So is a parable in the mouth of fools.
10	רַ֥ב מְחוֹלֵֽל־כֹּ֑ל וְשֹׂכֵ֥ר כְּ֝סִ֗יל וְשֹׂכֵ֥ר עֹבְרִֽים׃	A master performeth all things; But he that stoppeth a fool is as one that stoppeth a flood.
11	כְּ֭כֶלֶב שָׁ֣ב עַל־קֵא֑וֹ כְּ֝סִ֗יל שׁוֹנֶ֥ה בְאִוַּלְתּֽוֹ׃	As a dog that returneth to his vomit, So is a fool that repeateth his folly.
12	רָאִ֗יתָ אִ֭ישׁ חָכָ֣ם בְּעֵינָ֑יו תִּקְוָ֖ה לִכְסִ֣יל מִמֶּֽנּוּ׃	Seest thou a man wise in his own eyes? There is more hope of a fool than of him.
13	אָמַ֣ר עָ֭צֵל שַׁ֣חַל בַּדָּ֑רֶךְ אֲ֝רִ֗י בֵּ֣ין הָרְחֹבֽוֹת׃	The sluggard saith: ‘There is a lion in the way; Yea, a lion is in the streets.’
14	הַ֭דֶּלֶת תִּסּ֣וֹב עַל־צִירָ֑הּ וְ֝עָצֵ֗ל עַל־מִטָּתֽוֹ׃	The door is turning upon its hinges, And the sluggard is still upon his bed.
15	טָ֘מַ֤ן עָצֵ֣ל יָ֭דוֹ בַּצַּלָּ֑חַת נִ֝לְאָ֗ה לַהֲשִׁיבָ֥הּ אֶל־פִּֽיו׃	The sluggard burieth his hand in the dish; It wearieth him to bring it back to his mouth.
16	חָכָ֣ם עָצֵ֣ל בְּעֵינָ֑יו מִ֝שִּׁבְעָ֗ה מְשִׁ֣יבֵי טָֽעַם׃	The sluggard is wiser in his own eyes Than seven men that give wise answer.
17	מַחֲזִ֥יק בְּאׇזְנֵי־כָ֑לֶב עֹבֵ֥ר מִ֝תְעַבֵּ֗ר עַל־רִ֥יב לֹּא־לֽוֹ׃	He that passeth by, and meddleth with strife not his own, Is like one that taketh a dog by the ears.
18	כְּֽ֭מִתְלַהְלֵהַּ הַיֹּרֶ֥ה זִקִּ֗ים חִצִּ֥ים וָמָֽוֶת׃	As a madman who casteth firebrands, Arrows, and death;
19	כֵּֽן־אִ֭ישׁ רִמָּ֣ה אֶת־רֵעֵ֑הוּ וְ֝אָמַ֗ר הֲֽלֹא־מְשַׂחֵ֥ק אָֽנִי׃	So is the man that deceiveth his neighbour, And saith: ‘Am not I in sport?’
20	בְּאֶ֣פֶס עֵ֭צִים תִּכְבֶּה־אֵ֑שׁ וּבְאֵ֥ין נִ֝רְגָּ֗ן יִשְׁתֹּ֥ק מָדֽוֹן׃	Where no wood is, the fire goeth out; And where there is no whisperer, contention ceaseth.
21	פֶּחָ֣ם לְ֭גֶחָלִים וְעֵצִ֣ים לְאֵ֑שׁ וְאִ֥ישׁ (מדונים) [מִ֝דְיָנִ֗ים] לְחַרְחַר־רִֽיב׃	As coals are to burning coals, and wood to fire; So is a contentious man to kindle strife.
22	דִּבְרֵ֣י נִ֭רְגָּן כְּמִֽתְלַהֲמִ֑ים וְ֝הֵ֗ם יָרְד֥וּ חַדְרֵי־בָֽטֶן׃	The words of a whisperer are as dainty morsels, And they go down into the innermost parts of the body.
23	כֶּ֣סֶף סִ֭יגִים מְצֻפֶּ֣ה עַל־חָ֑רֶשׂ שְׂפָתַ֖יִם דֹּלְקִ֣ים וְלֶב־רָֽע׃	Burning lips and a wicked heart Are like an earthen vessel overlaid with silver dross.
24	בִּ֭שְׂפָתָו יִנָּכֵ֣ר שׂוֹנֵ֑א וּ֝בְקִרְבּ֗וֹ יָשִׁ֥ית מִרְמָֽה׃	He that hateth dissembleth with his lips, But he layeth up deceit within him.
25	כִּֽי־יְחַנֵּ֣ן ק֭וֹלוֹ אַל־תַּאֲמֶן־בּ֑וֹ כִּ֤י שֶׁ֖בַע תּוֹעֵב֣וֹת בְּלִבּֽוֹ׃	When he speaketh fair, Believe him not; For there are seven abominations in his heart.
26	תִּכַּסֶּ֣ה שִׂ֭נְאָה בְּמַשָּׁא֑וֹן תִּגָּלֶ֖ה רָֽעָת֣וֹ בְקָהָֽל׃	Though his hatred be concealed with deceit, His wickedness shall be revealed before the congregation.
27	כֹּֽרֶה־שַּׁ֭חַת בָּ֣הּ יִפּ֑וֹל וְג֥וֹלֵֽל אֶ֝֗בֶן אֵלָ֥יו תָּשֽׁוּב׃	Whoso diggeth a pit shall fall therein; And he that rolleth a stone, it shall return upon him.
28	לְֽשׁוֹן־שֶׁ֭קֶר יִשְׂנָ֣א דַכָּ֑יו וּפֶ֥ה חָ֝לָ֗ק יַעֲשֶׂ֥ה מִדְחֶֽה׃	A lying tongue hateth those that are crushed by it; And a flattering mouth worketh ruin.

=== Textual witnesses ===
Some early manuscripts containing the text of this chapter in Hebrew are of the Masoretic Text, which includes the Aleppo Codex (10th century), and Codex Leningradensis (1008).

There is also a translation into Koine Greek known as the Septuagint, made in the last few centuries BC; some extant ancient manuscripts of this version include Codex Vaticanus (B; $\mathfrak{G}$^{B}; 4th century), Codex Sinaiticus (S; BHK: $\mathfrak{G}$^{S}; 4th century), and Codex Alexandrinus (A; $\mathfrak{G}$^{A}; 5th century).

== Analysis ==
This chapter belongs to a further collection of Solomonic proverbs, transmitted and edited by royal scribes during the reign of Hezekiah, comprising Proverbs 25–29. Based on differences in style and subject-matter there could be two originally separate collections:

1. Proverbs 25–27: characterized by many similes and the 'earthy' tone
2. Proverbs 28–29: characterized by many antithetical sayings and the predominantly 'moral and religious' tone (cf. Proverbs 10–15)

The first twelve verses of this chapter, except verse 2, "Like a flitting sparrow, like a flying swallow, so a curse without cause shall not alight", form a series of sayings on the 'fool', so sometimes are called “the Book of Fools”.

=== Verse 1 ===
Like snow in summer or rain in harvest,

so honor is not fitting for a fool.

- "Honor": may likely refer to "respect, external recognition of worth, accolades, advancement to high position", etc., all of which would be 'out of place with a fool'.

=== Verse 17 ===
He who passes by and meddles with strife not belonging to him

is like one who takes a dog by the ears.

- "Meddles" from the Hebrew word מִתְעַבֵּר, mitʿabber, meaning "to put oneself in a fury" or "become furious"; the Latin version apparently assumed the verb was עָרַב, ʿarav, which has th sense of “meddle”.

== See also ==
- Blessing
- Divine judgment
- Evil
- Flattery
- Humility
- Pride
- Righteousness
- Soul in the Bible
- Theft
- Torah
- Truth
- Understanding
- Usury
- Wickedness
- Wisdom
- YHWH
- Related Bible parts: Exodus 22, Leviticus 25, Proverbs 10, Proverbs 15, Proverbs 25

== Sources ==
- Aitken, K. T. (2007). "19. Proverbs". In Barton, John; Muddiman, John (eds.). The Oxford Bible Commentary (first (paperback) ed.). Oxford University Press. pp. 405–422. ISBN 978-0199277186.
- Alter, Robert (2010). The Wisdom Books: Job, Proverbs, and Ecclesiastes: A Translation with Commentary. W.W. Norton & Co. ISBN 978-0393080735.
- Coogan, Michael David (2007). Coogan, Michael David; Brettler, Marc Zvi; Newsom, Carol Ann; Perkins, Pheme (eds.). The New Oxford Annotated Bible with the Apocryphal/Deuterocanonical Books: New Revised Standard Version, Issue 48 (Augmented 3rd ed.). Oxford University Press. ISBN 9780195288810.
- Farmer, Kathleen A. (1998). "The Wisdom Books". In McKenzie, Steven L.; Graham, Matt Patrick (eds.). The Hebrew Bible Today: An Introduction to Critical Issues. Westminster John Knox Press. ISBN 978-0-66425652-4.
- Fox, Michael V. (2009). Proverbs 10-31: A New Translation with Introduction and Commentary. Anchor Yale Bible Commentaries. Yale University Press. ISBN 978-0300155563.
- Halley, Henry H. (1965). Halley's Bible Handbook: an abbreviated Bible commentary (24th (revised) ed.). Zondervan Publishing House. ISBN 0-310-25720-4.
- Perdue, Leo G. (2012). Proverbs Interpretation: A Bible Commentary for Teaching and Preaching. Presbyterian Publishing Corporation. ISBN 978-0664238841.
- Würthwein, Ernst (1995). The Text of the Old Testament. Translated by Rhodes, Erroll F. Grand Rapids, MI: Wm. B. Eerdmans. ISBN 0-8028-0788-7.
