= Proverbs 27 =

Twenty-seventh chapter of the biblical book of Proverbs

- ← chapter 26 chapter 28 →
- The whole Book of Proverbs in the Leningrad Codex (1008 C.E.) from an old facsimile edition.
- Book: Book of Proverbs
- Category: Ketuvim
- Christian Bible part: Old Testament
- Order in the Christian part: 21

Proverbs 27 is the 27th chapter of the Book of Proverbs in the Hebrew Bible or the Old Testament of the Christian Bible. The book is a compilation of several wisdom literature collections, with the heading in 1:1 may be intended to regard Solomon as the traditional author of the whole book, but the dates of the individual collections are difficult to determine, and the book probably obtained its final shape in the post-exilic period. This chapter is the last part of the fifth collection of the book, so-called "the Second Solomonic Collection."

== Text ==
=== Hebrew ===
The following table shows the Hebrew text of Proverbs 27 with vowels alongside an English translation based upon the JPS 1917 translation (now in the public domain).

| Verse | Hebrew | English translation (JPS 1917) |
|---|---|---|
| 1 | אַֽל־תִּ֭תְהַלֵּל בְּי֣וֹם מָחָ֑ר כִּ֤י לֹֽא־תֵ֝דַ֗ע מַה־יֵּ֥לֶד יֽוֹם׃ | Boast not thyself of to- morrow; For thou knowest not what a day may bring forth. |
| 2 | יְהַלֶּלְךָ֣ זָ֣ר וְלֹא־פִ֑יךָ נׇ֝כְרִ֗י וְאַל־שְׂפָתֶֽיךָ׃ | Let another man praise thee, and not thine own mouth; A stranger, and not thine own lips. |
| 3 | כֹּֽבֶד־אֶ֭בֶן וְנֵ֣טֶל הַח֑וֹל וְכַ֥עַס אֱ֝וִ֗יל כָּבֵ֥ד מִשְּׁנֵיהֶֽם׃ | A stone is heavy, and the sand weighty; But a fool's vexation is heavier than they both. |
| 4 | אַכְזְרִיּ֣וּת חֵ֭מָה וְשֶׁ֣טֶף אָ֑ף וּמִ֥י יַ֝עֲמֹ֗ד לִפְנֵ֥י קִנְאָֽה׃ | Wrath is cruel, and anger is overwhelming; But who is able to stand before jealousy? |
| 5 | ט֭וֹבָה תּוֹכַ֣חַת מְגֻלָּ֑ה מֵאַהֲבָ֥ה מְסֻתָּֽרֶת׃ | Better is open rebuke Than love that is hidden. |
| 6 | נֶ֭אֱמָנִים פִּצְעֵ֣י אוֹהֵ֑ב וְ֝נַעְתָּר֗וֹת נְשִׁיק֥וֹת שׂוֹנֵֽא׃ | Faithful are the wounds of a friend; But the kisses of an enemy are importunate. |
| 7 | נֶ֣פֶשׁ שְׂ֭בֵעָה תָּב֣וּס נֹ֑פֶת וְנֶ֥פֶשׁ רְ֝עֵבָ֗ה כׇּל־מַ֥ר מָתֽוֹק׃ | The full soul loatheth a honeycomb; But to the hungry soul every bitter thing is sweet. |
| 8 | כְּ֭צִפּוֹר נוֹדֶ֣דֶת מִן־קִנָּ֑הּ כֵּֽן־אִ֝֗ישׁ נוֹדֵ֥ד מִמְּקוֹמֽוֹ׃ | As a bird that wandereth from her nest, So is a man that wandereth from his place. |
| 9 | שֶׁ֣מֶן וּ֭קְטֹרֶת יְשַׂמַּֽח־לֵ֑ב וּמֶ֥תֶק רֵ֝עֵ֗הוּ מֵעֲצַת־נָֽפֶשׁ׃ | Ointment and perfume rejoice the heart; So doth the sweetness of a man's friend by hearty counsel. |
| 10 | רֵ֥עֲךָ֨ (ורעה) [וְרֵ֪עַ] אָבִ֡יךָ אַֽל־תַּעֲזֹ֗ב וּבֵ֥ית אָחִ֗יךָ אַל־תָּ֭בוֹא בְּי֣וֹם אֵידֶ֑ךָ ט֥וֹב שָׁכֵ֥ן קָ֝ר֗וֹב מֵאָ֥ח רָחֽוֹק׃ | Thine own friend, and thy father's friend, forsake not; Neither go into thy brother's house in the day of thy calamity; Better is a neighbour that is near than a brother far off. |
| 11 | חֲכַ֣ם בְּ֭נִי וְשַׂמַּ֣ח לִבִּ֑י וְאָשִׁ֖יבָה חֹרְפִ֣י דָבָֽר׃ | My son, be wise, and make my heart glad, That I may answer him that taunteth me. |
| 12 | עָר֤וּם ׀ רָאָ֣ה רָעָ֣ה נִסְתָּ֑ר פְּ֝תָאיִ֗ם עָבְר֥וּ נֶעֱנָֽשׁוּ | A prudent man seeth the evil, and hideth himself; But the thoughtless pass on, and are punished. |
| 13 | קַח־בִּ֭גְדוֹ כִּי־עָ֣רַב זָ֑ר וּבְעַ֖ד נׇכְרִיָּ֣ה חַבְלֵֽהוּ׃ | Take his garment that is surety for a stranger; And hold him in pledge that is surety for an alien woman. |
| 14 | מְבָ֘רֵ֤ךְ רֵעֵ֨הוּ ׀ בְּק֣וֹל גָּ֭דוֹל בַּבֹּ֣קֶר הַשְׁכֵּ֑ים קְ֝לָלָ֗ה תֵּחָ֥שֶׁב לֽוֹ׃ | He that blesseth his friend with a loud voice, rising early in the morning, It shall be counted a curse to him. |
| 15 | דֶּ֣לֶף ט֭וֹרֵד בְּי֣וֹם סַגְרִ֑יר וְאֵ֥שֶׁת (מדונים) [מִ֝דְיָנִ֗ים] נִשְׁתָּוָֽה׃ | A continual dropping in a very rainy day And a contentious woman are alike; |
| 16 | צֹפְנֶ֥יהָ צָפַן־ר֑וּחַ וְשֶׁ֖מֶן יְמִינ֣וֹ יִקְרָֽא׃ | He that would hide her hideth the wind, And the ointment of his right hand betrayeth itself. |
| 17 | בַּרְזֶ֣ל בְּבַרְזֶ֣ל יָ֑חַד וְ֝אִ֗ישׁ יַ֣חַד פְּנֵֽי־רֵעֵֽהוּ׃ | Iron sharpeneth iron; So a man sharpeneth the countenance of his friend. |
| 18 | צֵ֣ר תְּ֭אֵנָה יֹאכַ֣ל פִּרְיָ֑הּ וְשֹׁמֵ֖ר אֲדֹנָ֣יו יְכֻבָּֽד׃ | Whoso keepeth the fig-tree shall eat the fruit thereof; And he that waiteth on his master shall be honoured. |
| 19 | כַּ֭מַּיִם הַפָּנִ֣ים לַפָּנִ֑ים כֵּ֤ן לֵֽב־הָ֝אָדָ֗ם לָאָדָֽם׃ | As in water face answereth to face, So the heart of man to man. |
| 20 | שְׁא֣וֹל וַ֭אֲבַדֹּה לֹ֣א תִשְׂבַּ֑עְנָה וְעֵינֵ֥י הָ֝אָדָ֗ם לֹ֣א תִשְׂבַּֽעְנָה׃ | The nether-world and Destruction are never satiated; So the eyes of man are never satiated. |
| 21 | מַצְרֵ֣ף לַ֭כֶּסֶף וְכ֣וּר לַזָּהָ֑ב וְ֝אִ֗ישׁ לְפִ֣י מַהֲלָלֽוֹ׃ | The refining pot is for silver, and the furnace for gold, And a man is tried by his praise. |
| 22 | אִ֥ם תִּכְתּֽוֹשׁ־אֶת־הָאֱוִ֨יל ׀ בַּ֥מַּכְתֵּ֡שׁ בְּת֣וֹךְ הָ֭רִיפוֹת בַּעֱלִ֑י לֹא־תָס֥וּר מֵ֝עָלָ֗יו אִוַּלְתּֽוֹ׃ | Though thou shouldest bray a fool in a mortar with a pestle among groats, Yet will not his foolishness depart from him. |
| 23 | יָדֹ֣עַ תֵּ֭דַע פְּנֵ֣י צֹאנֶ֑ךָ שִׁ֥ית לִ֝בְּךָ֗ לַעֲדָרִֽים׃ | Be thou diligent to know the state of thy flocks, And look well to thy herds; |
| 24 | כִּ֤י לֹ֣א לְעוֹלָ֣ם חֹ֑סֶן וְאִם־נֵ֝֗זֶר לְד֣וֹר (דור) [וָדֽוֹר]׃ | For riches are not for ever; And doth the crown endure unto all generations? |
| 25 | גָּלָ֣ה חָ֭צִיר וְנִרְאָה־דֶ֑שֶׁא וְ֝נֶאֶסְפ֗וּ עִשְּׂב֥וֹת הָרִֽים׃ | When the hay is mown, and the tender grass showeth itself, And the herbs of the mountains are gathered in; |
| 26 | כְּבָשִׂ֥ים לִלְבוּשֶׁ֑ךָ וּמְחִ֥יר שָׂ֝דֶ֗ה עַתּוּדִֽים׃ | The lambs will be for thy clothing, And the goats the price for a field. |
| 27 | וְדֵ֤י ׀ חֲלֵ֬ב עִזִּ֗ים לְֽ֭לַחְמְךָ לְלֶ֣חֶם בֵּיתֶ֑ךָ וְ֝חַיִּ֗ים לְנַעֲרוֹתֶֽיךָ׃ | And there will be goats’milk enough for thy food, for the food of thy household; And maintenance for thy maidens. |

=== Textual witnesses ===
Some early manuscripts containing the text of this chapter in Hebrew are of the Masoretic Text, which includes the Aleppo Codex (10th century), and Codex Leningradensis (1008).

There is also a translation into Koine Greek known as the Septuagint, made in the last few centuries BC; some extant ancient manuscripts of this version include Codex Vaticanus (B; $\mathfrak{G}$^{B}; 4th century), Codex Sinaiticus (S; BHK: $\mathfrak{G}$^{S}; 4th century), and Codex Alexandrinus (A; $\mathfrak{G}$^{A}; 5th century).

== Analysis ==
This chapter belongs to a further collection of Solomonic proverbs, transmitted and edited by royal scribes during the reign of Hezekiah, comprising Proverbs 25–29. Based on differences in style and subject-matter there could be two originally separate collections:

1. Proverbs 25–27: characterized by many similes and the 'earthy' tone
2. Proverbs 28–29: characterized by many antithetical sayings and the predominantly 'moral and religious' tone (cf. Proverbs 10–15)

The New King James Version adopts verse 7 as a sub-heading for this chapter, reflecting the argument from Methodist minister Arno Gaebelein that this section represents "instructions given to Solomon". Verses 23 to 27 are distinct and commend the life of a shepherd "as providing the best and most enduring kind of wealth".

=== Verse 1 ===
Do not boast about tomorrow,

for you do not know what a day may bring forth.

- "Do not boast": from Hebrew: אַל־תִּתְהַלֵּל, romanized: ʾal tithallel, in the Hitpael jussive negated form of the common verb “to praise,” or in this setting means “to praise oneself” or “to boast.”
- "A day": Perowne notes that the Septuagint refers to "the day" (Greek: ἡ ἐπιοῦσα, hē epiousa), meaning the next day, but he considers "a day", meaning " a future day", to be a preferable translation.

=== Verse 20 ===
Sheol and Abaddon are never satisfied,

and never satisfied are the eyes of man.

- "Sheol" or "hell" (KJV, NKJV, etc.) is depicted as 'a monster with a voracious appetite for human victims' (cf. Proverbs 1:12; 30:16). Human desires and ambition are just as insatiable and may also be as ruthless.
- "Abaddon": or "destruction" (KJV, NKJV, etc.).

== See also ==
- Blessing
- Divine judgment
- Evil
- Flattery
- Humility
- Pride
- Righteousness
- Soul in the Bible
- Theft
- Torah
- Truth
- Understanding
- Usury
- Wickedness
- Wisdom
- YHWH
- Related Bible parts: Exodus 22, Leviticus 25, Proverbs 10, Proverbs 15, Proverbs 25

== Sources ==
- Aitken, K. T. (2007). "19. Proverbs". In Barton, John; Muddiman, John (eds.). The Oxford Bible Commentary (first (paperback) ed.). Oxford University Press. pp. 405–422. ISBN 978-0199277186.
- Alter, Robert (2010). The Wisdom Books: Job, Proverbs, and Ecclesiastes: A Translation with Commentary. W.W. Norton & Co. ISBN 978-0393080735.
- Coogan, Michael David (2007). Coogan, Michael David; Brettler, Marc Zvi; Newsom, Carol Ann; Perkins, Pheme (eds.). The New Oxford Annotated Bible with the Apocryphal/Deuterocanonical Books: New Revised Standard Version, Issue 48 (Augmented 3rd ed.). Oxford University Press. ISBN 9780195288810.
- Farmer, Kathleen A. (1998). "The Wisdom Books". In McKenzie, Steven L.; Graham, Matt Patrick (eds.). The Hebrew Bible Today: An Introduction to Critical Issues. Westminster John Knox Press. ISBN 978-0-66425652-4.
- Fox, Michael V. (2009). Proverbs 10-31: A New Translation with Introduction and Commentary. Anchor Yale Bible Commentaries. Yale University Press. ISBN 978-0300155563.
- Halley, Henry H. (1965). Halley's Bible Handbook: an abbreviated Bible commentary (24th (revised) ed.). Zondervan Publishing House. ISBN 0-310-25720-4.
- Perdue, Leo G. (2012). Proverbs Interpretation: A Bible Commentary for Teaching and Preaching. Presbyterian Publishing Corporation. ISBN 978-0664238841.
- Würthwein, Ernst (1995). The Text of the Old Testament. Translated by Rhodes, Erroll F. Grand Rapids, MI: Wm. B. Eerdmans. ISBN 0-8028-0788-7.
