= Proverbs 28 =

Twenty-eighth chapter of the biblical book of Proverbs

- ← chapter 27 chapter 29 →
- The whole Book of Proverbs in the Leningrad Codex (1008 C.E.) from an old facsimile edition.
- Book: Book of Proverbs
- Category: Ketuvim
- Christian Bible part: Old Testament
- Order in the Christian part: 21

Proverbs 28 is the 28th chapter of the Book of Proverbs in the Hebrew Bible or the Old Testament of the Christian Bible. The book is a compilation of several wisdom literature collections, with the heading in 1:1 may be intended to regard Solomon as the traditional author of the whole book, but the dates of the individual collections are difficult to determine, and the book probably obtained its final shape in the post-exilic period. This chapter is the last part of the fifth collection of the book, so-called "the Second Solomonic Collection."

== Text ==
=== Hebrew ===
The following table shows the Hebrew text of Proverbs 28 with vowels alongside an English translation based upon the JPS 1917 translation (now in the public domain).

Verse	Hebrew	English translation (JPS 1917)
1	נָ֣סוּ וְאֵין־רֹדֵ֣ף רָשָׁ֑ע וְ֝צַדִּיקִ֗ים כִּכְפִ֥יר יִבְטָֽח׃	The wicked flee when no man pursueth; But the righteous are secure as a young lion.
2	בְּפֶ֣שַֽׁע אֶ֭רֶץ רַבִּ֣ים שָׂרֶ֑יהָ וּבְאָדָ֥ם מֵבִ֥ין יֹ֝דֵ֗עַ כֵּ֣ן יַאֲרִֽיךְ׃	For the transgression of a land many are the princes thereof; But by a man of understanding and knowledge established order shall long continue.
3	גֶּֽבֶר־רָ֭שׁ וְעֹשֵׁ֣ק דַּלִּ֑ים מָטָ֥ר סֹ֝חֵ֗ף וְאֵ֣ין לָֽחֶם׃	A poor man that oppresseth the weak Is like a sweeping rain which leaveth no food.
4	עֹזְבֵ֣י ת֭וֹרָה יְהַלְל֣וּ רָשָׁ֑ע וְשֹׁמְרֵ֥י ת֝וֹרָ֗ה יִתְגָּ֥רוּ בָֽם׃	They that forsake the law praise the wicked; But such as keep the law contend with them.
5	אַנְשֵׁי־רָ֭ע לֹא־יָבִ֣ינוּ מִשְׁפָּ֑ט וּמְבַקְשֵׁ֥י יְ֝הֹוָ֗ה יָבִ֥ינוּ כֹֽל׃	Evil men understand not justice; But they that seek the LORD understand all things.
6	טֽוֹב־רָ֭שׁ הוֹלֵ֣ךְ בְּתֻמּ֑וֹ מֵעִקֵּ֥שׁ דְּ֝רָכַ֗יִם וְה֣וּא עָשִֽׁיר׃	Better is the poor that walketh in his integrity, Than he that is perverse in his ways, though he be rich.
7	נוֹצֵ֣ר תּ֭וֹרָה בֵּ֣ן מֵבִ֑ין וְרֹעֶ֥ה ז֝וֹלְלִ֗ים יַכְלִ֥ים אָבִֽיו׃	A wise son observeth the teaching; But he that is a companion of gluttonous men shameth his father.
8	מַרְבֶּ֣ה ה֭וֹנוֹ בְּנֶ֣שֶׁךְ (ובתרבית) [וְתַרְבִּ֑ית] לְחוֹנֵ֖ן דַּלִּ֣ים יִקְבְּצֶֽנּוּ׃	He that augmenteth his substance by interest and increase, Gathereth it for him that is gracious to the poor.
9	מֵסִ֣יר אׇ֭זְנוֹ מִשְּׁמֹ֣עַ תּוֹרָ֑ה גַּ֥ם תְּ֝פִלָּת֗וֹ תּוֹעֵבָֽה׃	He that turneth away his ear from hearing the law, Even his prayer is an abomination.
10	מַשְׁגֶּ֤ה יְשָׁרִ֨ים ׀ בְּדֶ֥רֶךְ רָ֗ע בִּשְׁחוּת֥וֹ הֽוּא־יִפּ֑וֹל וּ֝תְמִימִ֗ים יִנְחֲלוּ־טֽוֹב׃	Whoso causeth the upright to go astray in an evil way, He shall fall himself into his own pit; But the whole-hearted shall inherit good.
11	חָכָ֣ם בְּ֭עֵינָיו אִ֣ישׁ עָשִׁ֑יר וְדַ֖ל מֵבִ֣ין יַחְקְרֶֽנּוּ׃	The rich man is wise in his own eyes; But the poor that hath understanding searcheth him through.
12	בַּעֲלֹ֣ץ צַ֭דִּיקִים רַבָּ֣ה תִפְאָ֑רֶת וּבְק֥וּם רְ֝שָׁעִ֗ים יְחֻפַּ֥שׂ אָדָֽם׃	When the righteous exult, there is great glory; But when the wicked rise, men must be sought for.
13	מְכַסֶּ֣ה פְ֭שָׁעָיו לֹ֣א יַצְלִ֑יחַ וּמוֹדֶ֖ה וְעֹזֵ֣ב יְרֻחָֽם׃	He that covereth his transgressions shall not prosper; But whoso confesseth and forsaketh them shall obtain mercy.
14	אַשְׁרֵ֣י אָ֭דָם מְפַחֵ֣ד תָּמִ֑יד וּמַקְשֶׁ֥ה לִ֝בּ֗וֹ יִפּ֥וֹל בְּרָעָֽה׃	Happy is the man that feareth always; But he that hardeneth his heart shall fall into evil.
15	אֲֽרִי־נֹ֭הֵם וְדֹ֣ב שׁוֹקֵ֑ק מוֹשֵׁ֥ל רָ֝שָׁ֗ע עַ֣ל עַם־דָּֽל׃	As a roaring lion, and a ravenous bear; So is a wicked ruler over a poor people.
16	נָגִ֗יד חֲסַ֣ר תְּ֭בוּנוֹת וְרַ֥ב מַעֲשַׁקּ֑וֹת (שנאי) [שֹׂ֥נֵא] בֶ֝֗צַע יַאֲרִ֥יךְ יָמִֽים׃	The prince that lacketh understanding is also a great oppressor; But he that hateth covetousness shall prolong his days.
17	אָ֭דָם עָשֻׁ֣ק בְּדַם־נָ֑פֶשׁ עַד־בּ֥וֹר יָ֝נ֗וּס אַל־יִתְמְכוּ־בֽוֹ׃	A man that is laden with the blood of any person Shall hasten his steps unto the pit; none will support him.
18	הוֹלֵ֣ךְ תָּ֭מִים יִוָּשֵׁ֑עַ וְנֶעְקַ֥שׁ דְּ֝רָכַ֗יִם יִפּ֥וֹל בְּאֶחָֽת׃	Whoso walketh uprightly shall be saved; But he that is perverse in his ways shall fall at once.
19	עֹבֵ֣ד אַ֭דְמָתוֹ יִֽשְׂבַּֽע־לָ֑חֶם וּמְרַדֵּ֥ף רֵ֝יקִ֗ים יִֽשְׂבַּֽע־רִֽישׁ׃	He that tilleth his ground shall have plenty of bread; But he that followeth after vain things shall have poverty enough.
20	אִ֣ישׁ אֱ֭מוּנוֹת רַב־בְּרָכ֑וֹת וְאָ֥ץ לְ֝הַעֲשִׁ֗יר לֹ֣א יִנָּקֶֽה׃	A faithful man shall abound with blessings; But he that maketh haste to be rich shall not be unpunished.
21	הַֽכֵּר־פָּנִ֥ים לֹא־ט֑וֹב וְעַל־פַּת־לֶ֝֗חֶם יִפְשַׁע־גָּֽבֶר׃	To have respect of persons is not good; For a man will transgress for a piece of bread.
22	נִ֥בְהָֽל לַה֗וֹן אִ֭ישׁ רַ֣ע עָ֑יִן וְלֹא־יֵ֝דַ֗ע כִּי־חֶ֥סֶר יְבֹאֶֽנּוּ׃	He that hath an evil eye hasteneth after riches, And knoweth not that want shall come upon him.
23	מ֘וֹכִ֤יחַ אָדָ֣ם אַ֭חֲרַי חֵ֣ן יִמְצָ֑א מִֽמַּחֲלִ֥יק לָשֽׁוֹן׃	He that rebuketh a man shall in the end find more favour Than he that flattereth with the tongue.
24	גּוֹזֵ֤ל ׀ אָ֘בִ֤יו וְאִמּ֗וֹ וְאֹמֵ֥ר אֵֽין־פָּ֑שַׁע חָבֵ֥ר ה֝֗וּא לְאִ֣ישׁ מַשְׁחִֽית׃	Whoso robbeth his father or his mother, and saith: ‘It is no transgression’, The same is the companion of a destroyer.
25	רְחַב־נֶ֭פֶשׁ יְגָרֶ֣ה מָד֑וֹן וּבֹטֵ֖חַ עַל־יְהֹוָ֣ה יְדֻשָּֽׁן׃	He that is of a greedy spirit stirreth up strife; But he that putteth his trust in the LORD shall be abundantly gratified.
26	בּוֹטֵ֣חַ בְּ֭לִבּוֹ ה֣וּא כְסִ֑יל וְהוֹלֵ֥ךְ בְּ֝חׇכְמָ֗ה ה֣וּא יִמָּלֵֽט׃	He that trusteth in his own heart is a fool; But whoso walketh wisely, he shall escape.
27	נוֹתֵ֣ן לָ֭רָשׁ אֵ֣ין מַחְס֑וֹר וּמַעְלִ֥ים עֵ֝ינָ֗יו רַב־מְאֵרֽוֹת׃	He that giveth unto the poor shall not lack; But he that hideth his eyes shall have many a curse.
28	בְּק֣וּם רְ֭שָׁעִים יִסָּתֵ֣ר אָדָ֑ם וּ֝בְאׇבְדָ֗ם יִרְבּ֥וּ צַדִּיקִֽים׃	When the wicked rise, men hide themselves; But when they perish, the righteous increase.

=== Textual witnesses ===
Some early manuscripts containing the text of this chapter in Hebrew are of the Masoretic Text, which includes the Aleppo Codex (10th century), and Codex Leningradensis (1008).

There is also a translation into Koine Greek known as the Septuagint, made in the last few centuries BC; some extant ancient manuscripts of this version include Codex Vaticanus (B; $\mathfrak{G}$^{B}; 4th century), Codex Sinaiticus (S; BHK: $\mathfrak{G}$^{S}; 4th century), and Codex Alexandrinus (A; $\mathfrak{G}$^{A}; 5th century).

== Analysis ==
This chapter belongs to a further collection of Solomonic proverbs, transmitted and edited by royal scribes during the reign of Hezekiah, comprising Proverbs 25–29. Based on differences in style and subject-matter there could be two originally separate collections:

1. Proverbs 25–27: characterized by many similes and the 'earthy' tone
2. Proverbs 28–29: characterized by many antithetical sayings and the predominantly 'moral and religious' tone (cf. Proverbs 10–15)

=== Verse 1 ===
The wicked flee when no one pursues,

but the righteous are bold as a lion.

- "The wicked flee": the insecurity of a guilty person—that person flees because of a guilty conscience, or because of suspicion of others around, or because that person fears judgment.

=== Verse 2 ===
Because of the transgression of a land, many are its princes;
But by a man of understanding and knowledge
Right will be prolonged.

New Revised Standard Version attempts to clarify the verse with a more intelligible reading:

When a land rebels,
it has many rulers;
but with an intelligent ruler
there is lasting order.

The reign of Hezekiah is associated with attempts to restore the union of Judah and Israel by political and religious means, which both proved unsuccessful.

In the Septuagint, this verse is presented as a saying about quarrelling:

By reason of the sins of ungodly men quarrels arise; but a wise man will quell them.

=== Verse 8 ===
One who increases his possessions by usury and extortion
Gathers it for him who will pity the poor.

- "Usury": is banned under the Mosaic law, by Exodus 22:25 and Leviticus 25:36–37.

=== Verse 9 ===
God detests the prayers
of a person who ignores the law.

=== Verse 10 ===
He who leads the upright astray in an evil way
Will himself fall into his own pit,
But the blameless will inherit good.

=== Verse 11 ===
A man of wealth is wise in his own eyes,
but the intelligent poor sees through him.

=== Verse 12 ===
When good people come to power, everybody celebrates, but when bad people rule, people stay in hiding.

=== Verse 13 ===
If you hide your sins, you will not succeed.
If you confess and reject them, you will receive mercy.

== See also ==
- Blessing
- Divine judgment
- Evil
- Flattery
- Humility
- Pride
- Righteousness
- Soul in the Bible
- Theft
- Torah
- Truth
- Understanding
- Usury
- Wickedness
- Wisdom
- YHWH
- Related Bible parts: Exodus 22, Leviticus 25, Proverbs 10, Proverbs 15, Proverbs 25

== Sources ==
- Aitken, K. T. (2007). "19. Proverbs". In Barton, John; Muddiman, John (eds.). The Oxford Bible Commentary (first (paperback) ed.). Oxford University Press. pp. 405–422. ISBN 978-0199277186.
- Alter, Robert (2010). The Wisdom Books: Job, Proverbs, and Ecclesiastes: A Translation with Commentary. W.W. Norton & Co. ISBN 978-0393080735.
- Coogan, Michael David (2007). Coogan, Michael David; Brettler, Marc Zvi; Newsom, Carol Ann; Perkins, Pheme (eds.). The New Oxford Annotated Bible with the Apocryphal/Deuterocanonical Books: New Revised Standard Version, Issue 48 (Augmented 3rd ed.). Oxford University Press. ISBN 9780195288810.
- Farmer, Kathleen A. (1998). "The Wisdom Books". In McKenzie, Steven L.; Graham, Matt Patrick (eds.). The Hebrew Bible Today: An Introduction to Critical Issues. Westminster John Knox Press. ISBN 978-0-66425652-4.
- Fox, Michael V. (2009). Proverbs 10-31: A New Translation with Introduction and Commentary. Anchor Yale Bible Commentaries. Yale University Press. ISBN 978-0300155563.
- Halley, Henry H. (1965). Halley's Bible Handbook: an abbreviated Bible commentary (24th (revised) ed.). Zondervan Publishing House. ISBN 0-310-25720-4.
- Perdue, Leo G. (2012). Proverbs Interpretation: A Bible Commentary for Teaching and Preaching. Presbyterian Publishing Corporation. ISBN 978-0664238841.
- Würthwein, Ernst (1995). The Text of the Old Testament. Translated by Rhodes, Erroll F. Grand Rapids, MI: Wm. B. Eerdmans. ISBN 0-8028-0788-7.
