= Proverbs 29 =

Twenty-ninth chapter of the biblical book of Proverbs

- ← chapter 28 chapter 30 →
- The whole Book of Proverbs in the Leningrad Codex (1008 C.E.) from an old facsimile edition.
- Book: Book of Proverbs
- Category: Ketuvim
- Christian Bible part: Old Testament
- Order in the Christian part: 21

Proverbs 29 is the 29th chapter of the Book of Proverbs in the Hebrew Bible or the Old Testament of the Christian Bible. The book is a compilation of several wisdom literature collections, with the heading in 1:1 may be intended to regard Solomon as the traditional author of the whole book, but the dates of the individual collections are difficult to determine, and the book probably obtained its final shape in the post-exilic period. This chapter is the last part of the fifth collection of the book, so-called "the Second Solomonic Collection".

== Text ==
=== Hebrew ===
The following table shows the Hebrew text of Proverbs 29 with vowels alongside an English translation based upon the JPS 1917 translation (now in the public domain).

Verse	Hebrew	English translation (JPS 1917)
1	אִ֣ישׁ תּ֭וֹכָחוֹת מַקְשֶׁה־עֹ֑רֶף פֶּ֥תַע יִ֝שָּׁבֵ֗ר וְאֵ֣ין מַרְפֵּֽא׃	He that being often reproved hardeneth his neck Shall suddenly be broken, and that without remedy.
2	בִּרְב֣וֹת צַ֭דִּיקִים יִשְׂמַ֣ח הָעָ֑ם וּבִמְשֹׁ֥ל רָ֝שָׁ֗ע יֵאָ֥נַֽח עָֽם׃	When the righteous are increased, the people rejoice; but when the wicked beareth rule, the people sigh.
3	אִישׁ־אֹהֵ֣ב חׇ֭כְמָה יְשַׂמַּ֣ח אָבִ֑יו וְרֹעֶ֥ה ז֝וֹנ֗וֹת יְאַבֶּד־הֽוֹן׃	Whoso loveth wisdom rejoiceth his father; but he that keepeth company with harlots wasteth his substance.
4	מֶ֗לֶךְ בְּ֭מִשְׁפָּט יַעֲמִ֣יד אָ֑רֶץ וְאִ֖ישׁ תְּרוּמ֣וֹת יֶהֶרְסֶֽנָּה׃	The king by justice establisheth the land; but he that exacteth gifts overthroweth it.
5	גֶּ֭בֶר מַחֲלִ֣יק עַל־רֵעֵ֑הוּ רֶ֝֗שֶׁת פּוֹרֵ֥שׂ עַל־פְּעָמָֽיו׃	A man that flattereth his neighbour spreadeth a net for his steps.
6	בְּפֶ֤שַֽׁע אִ֣ישׁ רָ֣ע מוֹקֵ֑שׁ וְ֝צַדִּ֗יק יָר֥וּן וְשָׂמֵֽחַ׃	In the transgression of an evil man there is a snare; but the righteous doth sing and rejoice.
7	יֹדֵ֣עַ צַ֭דִּיק דִּ֣ין דַּלִּ֑ים רָ֝שָׁ֗ע לֹא־יָבִ֥ין דָּֽעַת׃	The righteous taketh knowledge of the cause of the poor; the wicked understandeth not knowledge.
8	אַנְשֵׁ֣י לָ֭צוֹן יָפִ֣יחוּ קִרְיָ֑ה וַ֝חֲכָמִ֗ים יָשִׁ֥יבוּ אָֽף׃	Scornful men set a city in a blaze; But wise men turn away wrath.
9	אִֽישׁ־חָכָ֗ם נִ֭שְׁפָּט אֶת־אִ֣ישׁ אֱוִ֑יל וְרָגַ֥ז וְ֝שָׂחַ֗ק וְאֵ֣ין נָֽחַת׃	If a wise man contendeth with a foolish man, Whether he be angry or laugh, there will be no rest.
10	אַנְשֵׁ֣י דָ֭מִים יִשְׂנְאוּ־תָ֑ם וִ֝ישָׁרִ֗ים יְבַקְשׁ֥וּ נַפְשֽׁוֹ׃	The men of blood hate him that is sincere; And as for the upright, they seek his life.
11	כׇּל־ר֭וּחוֹ יוֹצִ֣יא כְסִ֑יל וְ֝חָכָ֗ם בְּאָח֥וֹר יְשַׁבְּחֶֽנָּה׃	A fool spendeth all his spirit; But a wise man stilleth it within him.
12	מֹ֭שֵׁל מַקְשִׁ֣יב עַל־דְּבַר־שָׁ֑קֶר כׇּֽל־מְשָׁרְתָ֥יו רְשָׁעִֽים׃	If a ruler hearkeneth to falsehood, All his servants are wicked.
13	רָ֤שׁ וְאִ֣ישׁ תְּכָכִ֣ים נִפְגָּ֑שׁוּ מֵ֤אִיר עֵינֵ֖י שְׁנֵיהֶ֣ם יְהֹוָֽה׃	The poor man and the oppressor meet together; The LORD giveth light to the eyes of them both.
14	מֶ֤לֶךְ שׁוֹפֵ֣ט בֶּאֱמֶ֣ת דַּלִּ֑ים כִּ֝סְא֗וֹ לָעַ֥ד יִכּֽוֹן׃	The king that faithfully judgeth the poor, His throne shall be established for ever.
15	שֵׁ֣בֶט וְ֭תוֹכַחַת יִתֵּ֣ן חׇכְמָ֑ה וְנַ֥עַר מְ֝שֻׁלָּ֗ח מֵבִ֥ישׁ אִמּֽוֹ׃	The rod and reproof give wisdom; But a child left to himself causeth shame to his mother.
16	בִּרְב֣וֹת רְ֭שָׁעִים יִרְבֶּה־פָּ֑שַׁע וְ֝צַדִּיקִ֗ים בְּֽמַפַּלְתָּ֥ם יִרְאֽוּ׃	When the wicked are increased, transgression increaseth; But the righteous shall gaze upon their fall.
17	יַסֵּ֣ר בִּ֭נְךָ וִינִיחֶ֑ךָ וְיִתֵּ֖ן מַעֲדַנִּ֣ים לְנַפְשֶֽׁךָ׃	Correct thy son, and he will give thee rest; Yea, he will give delight unto thy soul.
18	בְּאֵ֣ין חָ֭זוֹן יִפָּ֣רַֽע עָ֑ם וְשֹׁמֵ֖ר תּוֹרָ֣ה אַשְׁרֵֽהוּ׃	Where there is no vision, the people cast off restraint; But he that keepeth the law, happy is he.
19	בִּ֭דְבָרִים לֹא־יִוָּ֣סֶר עָ֑בֶד כִּֽי־יָ֝בִ֗ין וְאֵ֣ין מַעֲנֶֽה׃	A servant will not be corrected by words; For though he understand, there will be no response.
20	חָזִ֗יתָ אִ֭ישׁ אָ֣ץ בִּדְבָרָ֑יו תִּקְוָ֖ה לִכְסִ֣יל מִמֶּֽנּוּ׃	Seest thou a man that is hasty in his words? There is more hope for a fool than for him.
21	מְפַנֵּ֣ק מִנֹּ֣עַר עַבְדּ֑וֹ וְ֝אַחֲרִית֗וֹ יִהְיֶ֥ה מָנֽוֹן׃	He that delicately bringeth up his servant from a child Shall have him become master at the last.
22	אִֽישׁ־אַ֭ף יְגָרֶ֣ה מָד֑וֹן וּבַ֖עַל חֵמָ֣ה רַב־פָּֽשַׁע׃	An angry man stirreth up strife, And a wrathful man aboundeth in transgression.
23	גַּאֲוַ֣ת אָ֭דָם תַּשְׁפִּילֶ֑נּוּ וּשְׁפַל־ר֝֗וּחַ יִתְמֹ֥ךְ כָּבֽוֹד׃	A man's pride shall bring him low; but he that is of a lowly spirit shall attain to honour.
24	חוֹלֵ֣ק עִם־גַּ֭נָּב שׂוֹנֵ֣א נַפְשׁ֑וֹ אָלָ֥ה יִ֝שְׁמַ֗ע וְלֹ֣א יַגִּֽיד׃	Whoso is partner with a thief hateth his own soul: He heareth the adjuration and uttereth nothing.
25	חֶרְדַּ֣ת אָ֭דָם יִתֵּ֣ן מוֹקֵ֑שׁ וּבוֹטֵ֖חַ בַּיהֹוָ֣ה יְשֻׂגָּֽב׃	The fear of man bringeth a snare; but whoso putteth his trust in the LORD shall be set up on high.
26	רַ֭בִּים מְבַקְשִׁ֣ים פְּנֵֽי־מוֹשֵׁ֑ל וּ֝מֵיְהֹוָ֗ה מִשְׁפַּט־אִֽישׁ׃	Many seek the ruler's favour; but a man's judgment cometh from the LORD.
27	תּוֹעֲבַ֣ת צַ֭דִּיקִים אִ֣ישׁ עָ֑וֶל וְתוֹעֲבַ֖ת רָשָׁ֣ע יְשַׁר־דָּֽרֶךְ׃	An unjust man is an abomination to the righteous; and he that is upright in the way is an abomination to the wicked.

=== Textual witnesses ===
Some early manuscripts containing the text of this chapter in Hebrew are of the Masoretic Text, which includes the Aleppo Codex (10th century), and Codex Leningradensis (1008).

There is also a translation into Koine Greek known as the Septuagint, made in the last few centuries BC; some extant ancient manuscripts of this version include Codex Vaticanus (B; $\mathfrak{G}$^{B}; 4th century), Codex Sinaiticus (S; BHK: $\mathfrak{G}$^{S}; 4th century), and Codex Alexandrinus (A; $\mathfrak{G}$^{A}; 5th century).

== Analysis ==
This chapter belongs to a further collection of Solomonic proverbs, transmitted and edited by royal scribes during the reign of Hezekiah, comprising Proverbs 25–29. Based on differences in style and subject-matter there could be two originally separate collections:

1. Proverbs 25–27: characterized by many similes and the 'earthy' tone
2. Proverbs 28–29: characterized by many antithetical sayings and the predominantly 'moral and religious' tone (cf. Proverbs 10–15)

=== Verse 1 ===
He who is often reproved, yet hardens his neck,

will suddenly be destroyed, and that without remedy.

- "He who is often reproved": from a Hebrew construction אִישׁ תּוֹכָחוֹת ʾish tokhakhot, "a man of rebukes", meaning "a man who has (or receives) many rebukes" to describe a person 'who is deserving of punishment and who has been given many warnings'.
- "Hardens his neck": or "stiffens his neck" (ESV) from a Hebrew idiom מַקְשֶׁה־עֹרֶף maqsheh-ʿoref, "to harden the neck", with the idea of 'resisting the rebukes and persisting in obstinacy' (cf. Exodus 32:9), as the opposite of "bending back" or 'submission'.

=== Verse 2 ===
When the righteous increase, the people rejoice,

but when the wicked rule, the people groan.

- "When the wicked rule": this cause the groaning of the people 'under an intolerable burden as injustice and violence would flourish unchecked' (verse 2, 16), but righteousness will prevail in the end (cf. Proverbs 11:10–11; 28:12, 28).

=== Verse 14 ===
The king who judges the poor with truth,
His throne will be established forever.

Methodist commentator Joseph Benson makes the point that a king who judges the poor "faithfully" (the word used in the King James Version) also judges the rich "faithfully", but he argues that the proverb "names the poor, because these are much oppressed and injured by others, and least regarded by princes, and yet committed to their more especial care".

=== Verse 27 ===
An unjust man is an abomination to the righteous,
And he who is upright in the way is an abomination to the wicked.

This final verse of chapter 29 has additional words in the Latin Vulgate, Verbum custodiens filius extra perditionem erit, which appear in some versions of the Septuagint after Proverbs 24:22. This line is translated in the Douay-Rheims 1899 American Edition as "The son that keepeth the word, shall be free from destruction".

== See also ==
- Blessing
- Divine judgment
- Evil
- Flattery
- Humility
- Pride
- Righteousness
- Soul in the Bible
- Theft
- Torah
- Truth
- Understanding
- Wickedness
- Wisdom
- YHWH
- Related Bible parts: Proverbs 10, Proverbs 15, Proverbs 25

== Sources ==
- Aitken, K. T. (2007). "19. Proverbs". In Barton, John; Muddiman, John (eds.). The Oxford Bible Commentary (first (paperback) ed.). Oxford University Press. pp. 405–422. ISBN 978-0199277186.
- Alter, Robert (2010). The Wisdom Books: Job, Proverbs, and Ecclesiastes: A Translation with Commentary. W.W. Norton & Co. ISBN 978-0393080735.
- Coogan, Michael David (2007). Coogan, Michael David; Brettler, Marc Zvi; Newsom, Carol Ann; Perkins, Pheme (eds.). The New Oxford Annotated Bible with the Apocryphal/Deuterocanonical Books: New Revised Standard Version, Issue 48 (Augmented 3rd ed.). Oxford University Press. ISBN 9780195288810.
- Farmer, Kathleen A. (1998). "The Wisdom Books". In McKenzie, Steven L.; Graham, Matt Patrick (eds.). The Hebrew Bible Today: An Introduction to Critical Issues. Westminster John Knox Press. ISBN 978-0-66425652-4.
- Fox, Michael V. (2009). Proverbs 10-31: A New Translation with Introduction and Commentary. Anchor Yale Bible Commentaries. Yale University Press. ISBN 978-0300155563.
- Halley, Henry H. (1965). Halley's Bible Handbook: an abbreviated Bible commentary (24th (revised) ed.). Zondervan Publishing House. ISBN 0-310-25720-4.
- Perdue, Leo G. (2012). Proverbs Interpretation: A Bible Commentary for Teaching and Preaching. Presbyterian Publishing Corporation. ISBN 978-0664238841.
- Würthwein, Ernst (1995). The Text of the Old Testament. Translated by Rhodes, Erroll F. Grand Rapids, MI: Wm. B. Eerdmans. ISBN 0-8028-0788-7.
