= Proverbs 25 =

Twenty-fifth chapter of the biblical book of Proverbs

- ← chapter 24 chapter 26 →
- The whole Book of Proverbs in the Leningrad Codex (1008 C.E.) from an old facsimile edition.
- Book: Book of Proverbs
- Category: Ketuvim
- Christian Bible part: Old Testament
- Order in the Christian part: 21

Proverbs 25 is the 25th chapter of the Book of Proverbs in the Hebrew Bible or the Old Testament of the Christian Bible. The book is a compilation of several wisdom literature collections; the heading in Proverbs 1:1 may be intended to show Solomon as the traditional author of the whole book, but the dates of the individual collections are difficult to determine, and the book probably obtained its final shape in the post-exilic period. This chapter is the last part of the fifth collection of the book, so-called "the Second Solomonic Collection."

== Text ==
=== Hebrew ===
The following table shows the Hebrew text of Proverbs 25 with vowels alongside an English translation based upon the JPS 1917 translation (now in the public domain).

Verse	Hebrew	English translation (JPS 1917)
1	גַּם־אֵ֭לֶּה מִשְׁלֵ֣י שְׁלֹמֹ֑ה אֲשֶׁ֥ר הֶ֝עְתִּ֗יקוּ אַנְשֵׁ֤י ׀ חִזְקִיָּ֬ה מֶלֶךְ־יְהוּדָֽה׃	These also are proverbs of Solomon, which the men of Hezekiah king of Judah copied out.
2	כְּבֹ֣ד אֱ֭לֹהִים הַסְתֵּ֣ר דָּבָ֑ר וּכְבֹ֥ד מְ֝לָכִ֗ים חֲקֹ֣ר דָּבָֽר׃	It is the glory of God to conceal a thing; but the glory of kings is to search out a matter.
3	שָׁמַ֣יִם לָ֭רוּם וָאָ֣רֶץ לָעֹ֑מֶק וְלֵ֥ב מְ֝לָכִ֗ים אֵ֣ין חֵֽקֶר׃	The heaven for height, and the earth for depth, and the heart of kings is unsearchable.
4	הָג֣וֹ סִיגִ֣ים מִכָּ֑סֶף וַיֵּצֵ֖א לַצֹּרֵ֣ף כֶּֽלִי׃	Take away the dross from the silver, and there cometh forth a vessel for the refiner;
5	הָג֣וֹ רָ֭שָׁע לִפְנֵי־מֶ֑לֶךְ וְיִכּ֖וֹן בַּצֶּ֣דֶק כִּסְאֽוֹ׃	Take away the wicked from before the king, and his throne shall be established in righteousness.
6	אַל־תִּתְהַדַּ֥ר לִפְנֵי־מֶ֑לֶךְ וּבִמְק֥וֹם גְּ֝דֹלִ֗ים אַֽל־תַּעֲמֹֽד׃	Glorify not thyself in the presence of the king, and stand not in the place of great men;
7	כִּ֤י ט֥וֹב אֲמׇר־לְךָ֗ עֲֽלֵ֫ה־הֵ֥נָּה מֵ֭הַשְׁפִּ֣ילְךָ לִפְנֵ֣י נָדִ֑יב אֲשֶׁ֖ר רָא֣וּ עֵינֶֽיךָ׃	For better is it that it be said unto thee: ‘Come up hither’, than that thou shouldest be put lower in the presence of the prince, whom thine eyes have seen.
8	אַל־תֵּצֵ֥א לָרִ֗ב מַ֫הֵ֥ר פֶּ֣ן מַה־תַּ֭עֲשֶׂה בְּאַחֲרִיתָ֑הּ בְּהַכְלִ֖ים אֹתְךָ֣ רֵעֶֽךָ׃	Go not forth hastily to strive, lest thou know not what to do in the end thereof, when thy neighbour hath put thee to shame.
9	רִ֭יבְךָ רִ֣יב אֶת־רֵעֶ֑ךָ וְס֖וֹד אַחֵ֣ר אַל־תְּגָֽל׃	Debate thy cause with thy neighbour, but reveal not the secret of another;
10	פֶּֽן־יְחַסֶּדְךָ֥ שֹׁמֵ֑עַ וְ֝דִבָּתְךָ֗ לֹ֣א תָשֽׁוּב׃	Lest he that heareth it revile thee, and thine infamy turn not away.
11	תַּפּוּחֵ֣י זָ֭הָב בְּמַשְׂכִּיּ֣וֹת כָּ֑סֶף דָּ֝בָ֗ר דָּבֻ֥ר עַל־אׇפְנָֽיו׃	A word fitly spoken Is like apples of gold in settings of silver.
12	נֶ֣זֶם זָ֭הָב וַחֲלִי־כָ֑תֶם מוֹכִ֥יחַ חָ֝כָ֗ם עַל־אֹ֥זֶן שֹׁמָֽעַת׃	As an ear-ring of gold, and an ornament of fine gold, So is a wise reprover upon an obedient ear.
13	כְּצִנַּת־שֶׁ֨לֶג ׀ בְּי֬וֹם קָצִ֗יר צִ֣יר נֶ֭אֱמָן לְשֹׁלְחָ֑יו וְנֶ֖פֶשׁ אֲדֹנָ֣יו יָשִֽׁיב׃	As the cold of snow in the time of harvest, So is a faithful messenger to him that sendeth him; For he refresheth the soul of his master. .
14	נְשִׂיאִ֣ים וְ֭רוּחַ וְגֶ֣שֶׁם אָ֑יִן אִ֥ישׁ מִ֝תְהַלֵּ֗ל בְּמַתַּת־שָֽׁקֶר׃	As vapours and wind without rain, So is he that boasteth himself of a false gift.
15	בְּאֹ֣רֶךְ אַ֭פַּיִם יְפֻתֶּ֣ה קָצִ֑ין וְלָשׁ֥וֹן רַ֝כָּ֗ה תִּשְׁבׇּר־גָּֽרֶם׃	By long forbearing is a ruler persuaded, And a soft tongue breaketh the bone.
16	דְּבַ֣שׁ מָ֭צָאתָ אֱכֹ֣ל דַּיֶּ֑ךָּ פֶּן־תִּ֝שְׂבָּעֶ֗נּוּ וַהֲקֵאתֽוֹ׃	Hast thou found honey? eat so much as is sufficient for thee, Lest thou be filled therewith, and vomit it.
17	הֹקַ֣ר רַ֭גְלְךָ מִבֵּ֣ית רֵעֶ֑ךָ פֶּן־יִ֝שְׂבָּעֲךָ֗ וּשְׂנֵאֶֽךָ׃	Let thy foot be seldom in thy neighbour's house; Lest he be sated with thee, and hate thee.
18	מֵפִ֣יץ וְ֭חֶרֶב וְחֵ֣ץ שָׁנ֑וּן אִ֥ישׁ עֹנֶ֥ה בְ֝רֵעֵ֗הוּ עֵ֣ד שָֽׁקֶר׃	As a maul, and a sword, and a sharp arrow, So is a man that beareth false witness against his neighbour.
19	שֵׁ֣ן רֹ֭עָה וְרֶ֣גֶל מוּעָ֑דֶת מִבְטָ֥ח בּ֝וֹגֵ֗ד בְּי֣וֹם צָרָֽה	Confidence in an unfaithful man in time of trouble Is like a broken tooth, and a foot out of joint.
20	מַ֥עֲדֶה־בֶּ֨גֶד ׀ בְּי֣וֹם קָ֭רָה חֹ֣מֶץ עַל־נָ֑תֶר וְשָׁ֥ר בַּ֝שִּׁרִ֗ים עַ֣ל לֶב־רָֽע׃	As one that taketh off a garment in cold weather, and as vinegar upon nitre, So is he that singeth songs to a heavy heart.
21	אִם־רָעֵ֣ב שֹׂ֭נַאֲךָ הַאֲכִלֵ֣הוּ לָ֑חֶם וְאִם־צָ֝מֵ֗א הַשְׁקֵ֥הוּ מָֽיִם׃	If thine enemy be hungry, give him bread to eat, And if he be thirsty, give him water to drink;
22	כִּ֤י גֶחָלִ֗ים אַ֭תָּה חֹתֶ֣ה עַל־רֹאשׁ֑וֹ וַ֝יהֹוָ֗ה יְשַׁלֶּם־לָֽךְ׃	For thou wilt heap coals of fire upon his head, And the LORD will reward thee.
23	ר֣וּחַ צָ֭פוֹן תְּח֣וֹלֵֽל גָּ֑שֶׁם וּפָנִ֥ים נִ֝זְעָמִ֗ים לְשׁ֣וֹן סָֽתֶר׃	The north wind bringeth forth rain, And a backbiting tongue an angry countenance.
24	ט֗וֹב שֶׁ֥בֶת עַל־פִּנַּת־גָּ֑ג מֵאֵ֥שֶׁת (מדונים) [מִ֝דְיָנִ֗ים] וּבֵ֥ית חָֽבֶר׃	It is better to dwell in a corner of the housetop, Than in a house in common with a contentious woman.
25	מַ֣יִם קָ֭רִים עַל־נֶ֣פֶשׁ עֲיֵפָ֑ה וּשְׁמוּעָ֥ה ט֝וֹבָ֗ה מֵאֶ֥רֶץ מֶרְחָֽק׃	As cold waters to a faint soul, So is good news from a far country.
26	מַעְיָ֣ן נִ֭רְפָּשׂ וּמָק֣וֹר מׇשְׁחָ֑ת צַ֝דִּ֗יק מָ֣ט לִפְנֵֽי־רָשָֽׁע׃	As a troubled fountain, and a corrupted spring, So is a righteous man that giveth way before the wicked.
27	אָ֘כֹ֤ל דְּבַ֣שׁ הַרְבּ֣וֹת לֹא־ט֑וֹב וְחֵ֖קֶר כְּבֹדָ֣ם כָּבֽוֹד׃	It is not good to eat much honey; So for men to search out their own glory is not glory.
28	עִ֣יר פְּ֭רוּצָה אֵ֣ין חוֹמָ֑ה אִ֝֗ישׁ אֲשֶׁ֤ר אֵ֖ין מַעְצָ֣ר לְרוּחֽוֹ׃	Like a city broken down and without a wall, So is he whose spirit is without restraint.

=== Textual witnesses ===
Some early manuscripts containing the text of this chapter in Hebrew are of the Masoretic Text, which includes the Aleppo Codex (10th century), and Codex Leningradensis (1008).

There is also a translation into Koine Greek known as the Septuagint, made in the last few centuries BC; some extant ancient manuscripts of this version include Codex Vaticanus (B; $\mathfrak{G}$^{B}; 4th century), Codex Sinaiticus (S; BHK: $\mathfrak{G}$^{S}; 4th century), and Codex Alexandrinus (A; $\mathfrak{G}$^{A}; 5th century).

== Analysis ==
This chapter belongs to a further collection of Solomonic proverbs, transmitted and edited by royal scribes during the reign of Hezekiah, comprising Proverbs 25–29. This collection is introduced within the text as "[the] proverbs of Solomon which the men of Hezekiah king of Judah copied". Hezekiah was the 13th king of Judah from 726 BCE to 697 BCE, who is favorably spoken of in 2 Kings 18:3.

Based on differences in style and subject-matter there could be two originally separate collections:

1. Proverbs 25–27: characterized by many similes and the 'earthy' tone
2. Proverbs 28–29: characterized by many antithetical sayings and the predominantly 'moral and religious' tone (cf. Proverbs 10–15)

Aberdeen theologian Kenneth Aitken argues that chapters 25–27 and 28–29 were originally separate collections, while Methodist minister Arno Gaebelein argues that chapters 27–29 as a unit constitute "instructions given to Solomon".

Verses 2 to 7 consist of a series of sayings regarding the king, followed by advice in verses 6 and 7 directed to royal officials.

=== Verse 1 ===
These are also proverbs of Solomon,

which the men of Hezekiah king of Judah copied.

The proverbs in this collection differ from the earlier ones in that these are 'multiple line sayings using more similes'.

=== Verses 6–7 ===
^{6}Do not exalt yourself in the presence of the king,

and do not stand in the place of great men;

^{7}for it is better that it be said to you, “Come up here,"

than that you should be put lower in the presence of the prince,

whom your eyes have seen.

David Brown notes that Jesus' parable in Luke 14:7–11 includes "a reproduction" of verses 6 and 7.

== See also ==
- Blessing
- Divine judgment
- Evil
- Flattery
- Humility
- Pride
- Righteousness
- Soul in the Bible
- Theft
- Torah
- Truth
- Understanding
- Usury
- Wickedness
- Wisdom
- YHWH
- Related Bible parts: Proverbs 10, Proverbs 15, Proverbs 26, Luke 14

== Sources ==
- Aitken, K. T. (2007). "19. Proverbs". In Barton, John; Muddiman, John (eds.). The Oxford Bible Commentary (first (paperback) ed.). Oxford University Press. pp. 405–422. ISBN 978-0199277186.
- Alter, Robert (2010). The Wisdom Books: Job, Proverbs, and Ecclesiastes: A Translation with Commentary. W.W. Norton & Co. ISBN 978-0393080735.
- Coogan, Michael David (2007). Coogan, Michael David; Brettler, Marc Zvi; Newsom, Carol Ann; Perkins, Pheme (eds.). The New Oxford Annotated Bible with the Apocryphal/Deuterocanonical Books: New Revised Standard Version, Issue 48 (Augmented 3rd ed.). Oxford University Press. ISBN 9780195288810.
- Farmer, Kathleen A. (1998). "The Wisdom Books". In McKenzie, Steven L.; Graham, Matt Patrick (eds.). The Hebrew Bible Today: An Introduction to Critical Issues. Westminster John Knox Press. ISBN 978-0-66425652-4.
- Fox, Michael V. (2009). Proverbs 10-31: A New Translation with Introduction and Commentary. Anchor Yale Bible Commentaries. Yale University Press. ISBN 978-0300155563.
- Halley, Henry H. (1965). Halley's Bible Handbook: an abbreviated Bible commentary (24th (revised) ed.). Zondervan Publishing House. ISBN 0-310-25720-4.
- Perdue, Leo G. (2012). Proverbs Interpretation: A Bible Commentary for Teaching and Preaching. Presbyterian Publishing Corporation. ISBN 978-0664238841.
- Würthwein, Ernst (1995). The Text of the Old Testament. Translated by Rhodes, Erroll F. Grand Rapids, MI: Wm. B. Eerdmans. ISBN 0-8028-0788-7.
