= Proverbs 10 =

Tenth chapter of the biblical book of Proverbs

- ← chapter 9 chapter 11 →
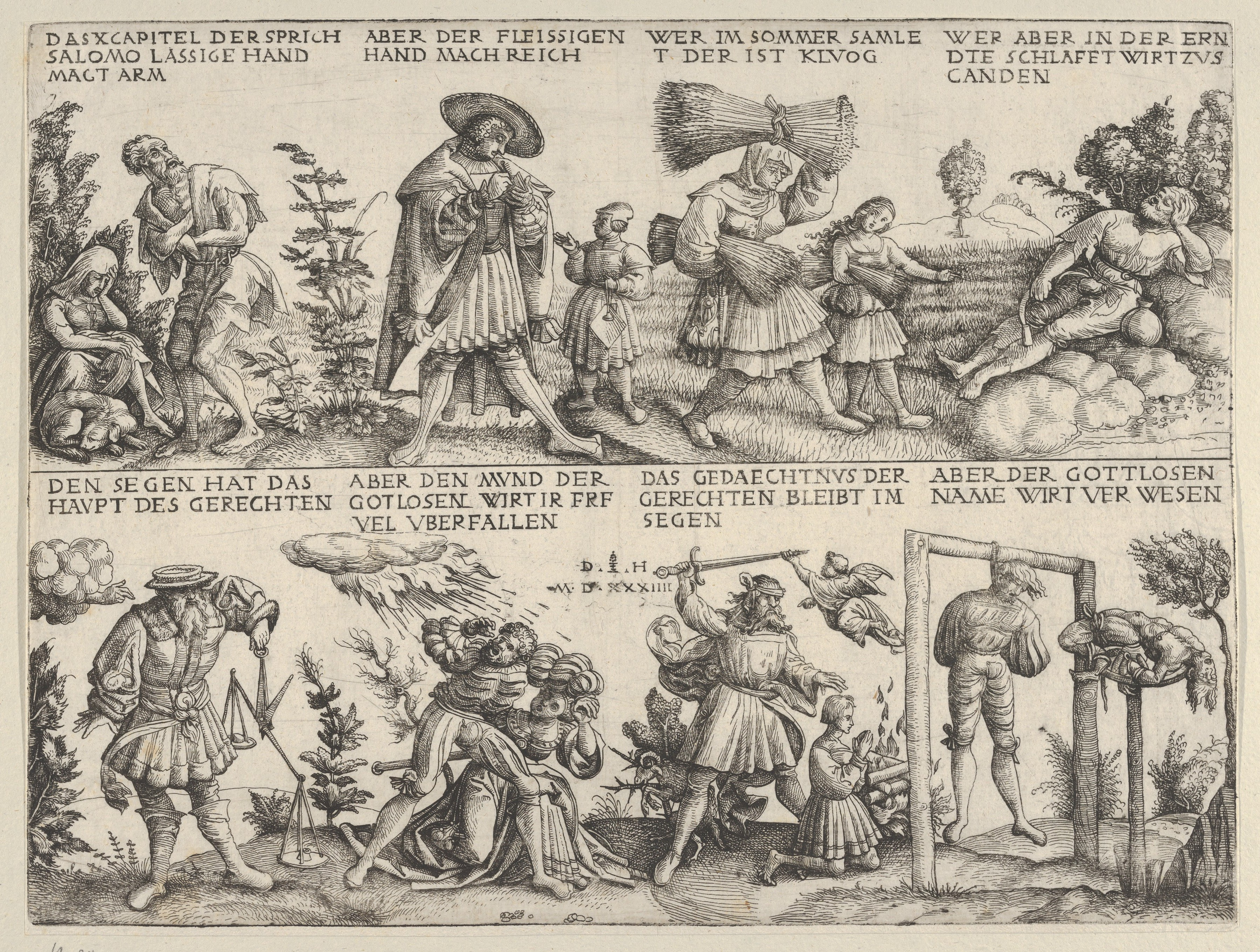
- "Illustrations to Proverbs 10: 4-7" by Daniel Hopfer (1470–1536) c. 1534
- Book: Book of Proverbs
- Category: Ketuvim
- Christian Bible part: Old Testament
- Order in the Christian part: 21

Proverbs 10 is the tenth chapter of the Book of Proverbs in the Hebrew Bible or the Old Testament of the Christian Bible. The book is a compilation of several wisdom literature collections, with the heading in 1:1 may be intended to regard Solomon as the traditional author of the whole book, but the dates of the individual collections are difficult to determine, and the book probably obtained its final shape in the post-exilic period. This chapter is a part of the second collection of the book.

== Text ==
=== Hebrew ===
The following table shows the Hebrew text of Proverbs 10 with vowels alongside an English translation based upon the JPS 1917 translation (now in the public domain).

Verse	Hebrew	English translation (JPS 1917)
1	מִשְׁלֵ֗י שְׁלֹ֫מֹ֥ה בֵּ֣ן חָ֭כָם יְשַׂמַּח־אָ֑ב וּבֵ֥ן כְּ֝סִ֗יל תּוּגַ֥ת אִמּֽוֹ׃	The proverbs of Solomon. A wise son maketh a glad father; but a foolish son is the grief of his mother.
2	לֹֽא־י֭וֹעִילוּ אוֹצְר֣וֹת רֶ֑שַׁע וּ֝צְדָקָ֗ה תַּצִּ֥יל מִמָּֽוֶת׃	Treasures of wickedness profit nothing; but righteousness delivereth from death.
3	לֹא־יַרְעִ֣יב יְ֭הֹוָה נֶ֣פֶשׁ צַדִּ֑יק וְהַוַּ֖ת רְשָׁעִ֣ים יֶהְדֹּֽף׃	The LORD will not suffer the soul of the righteous to famish; but He thrusteth away the desire of the wicked.
4	רָ֗אשׁ עֹשֶׂ֥ה כַף־רְמִיָּ֑ה וְיַ֖ד חָרוּצִ֣ים תַּעֲשִֽׁיר׃	He becometh poor that dealeth with a slack hand; but the hand of the diligent maketh rich.
5	אֹגֵ֣ר בַּ֭קַּיִץ בֵּ֣ן מַשְׂכִּ֑יל נִרְדָּ֥ם בַּ֝קָּצִ֗יר בֵּ֣ן מֵבִֽישׁ׃	A wise son gathereth in summer; but a son that doeth shamefully sleepeth in harvest.
6	בְּ֭רָכוֹת לְרֹ֣אשׁ צַדִּ֑יק וּפִ֥י רְ֝שָׁעִ֗ים יְכַסֶּ֥ה חָמָֽס׃	Blessings are upon the head of the righteous; but the mouth of the wicked concealeth violence.
7	זֵ֣כֶר צַ֭דִּיק לִבְרָכָ֑ה וְשֵׁ֖ם רְשָׁעִ֣ים יִרְקָֽב׃	The memory of the righteous shall be for a blessing; but the name of the wicked shall rot.
8	חֲכַם־לֵ֭ב יִקַּ֣ח מִצְוֺ֑ת וֶאֱוִ֥יל שְׂ֝פָתַ֗יִם יִלָּבֵֽט׃	The wise in heart will receive commandments; but a prating fool shall fall.
9	הוֹלֵ֣ךְ בַּ֭תֹּם יֵ֣לֶךְ בֶּ֑טַח וּמְעַקֵּ֥שׁ דְּ֝רָכָ֗יו יִוָּדֵֽעַ׃	He that walketh uprightly walketh securely; but he that perverteth his ways shall be found out.
10	קֹ֣רֵֽץ עַ֭יִן יִתֵּ֣ן עַצָּ֑בֶת וֶאֱוִ֥יל שְׂ֝פָתַ֗יִם יִלָּבֵֽט׃	He that winketh with the eye causeth sorrow; and a prating fool shall fall.
11	מְק֣וֹר חַ֭יִּים פִּ֣י צַדִּ֑יק וּפִ֥י רְ֝שָׁעִ֗ים יְכַסֶּ֥ה חָמָֽס׃	The mouth of the righteous is a fountain of life; but the mouth of the wicked concealeth violence.
12	שִׂ֭נְאָה תְּעֹרֵ֣ר מְדָנִ֑ים וְעַ֥ל כׇּל־פְּ֝שָׁעִ֗ים תְּכַסֶּ֥ה אַהֲבָֽה׃	Hatred stirreth up strifes; but love covereth all transgressions.
13	בְּשִׂפְתֵ֣י נָ֭בוֹן תִּמָּצֵ֣א חׇכְמָ֑ה וְ֝שֵׁ֗בֶט לְגֵ֣ו חֲסַר־לֵֽב׃	In the lips of him that hath discernment wisdom is found; but a rod is for the back of him that is void of understanding.
14	חֲכָמִ֥ים יִצְפְּנוּ־דָ֑עַת וּפִֽי־אֱ֝וִ֗יל מְחִתָּ֥ה קְרֹבָֽה׃	Wise men lay up knowledge; but the mouth of the foolish is an imminent ruin.
15	ה֣וֹן עָ֭שִׁיר קִרְיַ֣ת עֻזּ֑וֹ מְחִתַּ֖ת דַּלִּ֣ים רֵישָֽׁם׃	The rich man’s wealth is his strong city; the ruin of the poor is their poverty.
16	פְּעֻלַּ֣ת צַדִּ֣יק לְחַיִּ֑ים תְּבוּאַ֖ת רָשָׁ֣ע לְחַטָּֽאת׃	he wages of the righteous is life; The increase of the wicked is sin.
17	אֹ֣רַח לְ֭חַיִּים שׁוֹמֵ֣ר מוּסָ֑ר וְעֹזֵ֖ב תּוֹכַ֣חַת מַתְעֶֽה׃	He is in the way of life that heedeth instruction; But he that forsaketh reproof erreth.
18	מְכַסֶּ֣ה שִׂ֭נְאָה שִׂפְתֵי־שָׁ֑קֶר וּמוֹצִ֥א דִ֝בָּ֗ה ה֣וּא כְסִֽיל׃	He that hideth hatred is of lying lips; And he that uttereth a slander is a fool.
19	בְּרֹ֣ב דְּ֭בָרִים לֹ֣א יֶחְדַּל־פָּ֑שַׁע וְחוֹשֵׂ֖ךְ שְׂפָתָ֣יו מַשְׂכִּֽיל׃	In the multitude of words there wanteth not transgression; But he that refraineth his lips is wise.
20	כֶּ֣סֶף נִ֭בְחָר לְשׁ֣וֹן צַדִּ֑יק לֵ֖ב רְשָׁעִ֣ים כִּמְעָֽט׃	The tongue of the righteous is as choice silver; The heart of the wicked is little worth.
21	שִׂפְתֵ֣י צַ֭דִּיק יִרְע֣וּ רַבִּ֑ים וֶ֝אֱוִילִ֗ים בַּחֲסַר־לֵ֥ב יָמֽוּתוּ׃	The lips of the righteous feed many; But the foolish die for want of understanding. .
22	בִּרְכַּ֣ת יְ֭הֹוָה הִ֣יא תַעֲשִׁ֑יר וְלֹֽא־יוֹסִ֖ף עֶ֣צֶב עִמָּֽהּ׃	The blessing of the LORD, it maketh rich, And toil addeth nothing thereto.
23	כִּשְׂח֣וֹק לִ֭כְסִיל עֲשׂ֣וֹת זִמָּ֑ה וְ֝חׇכְמָ֗ה לְאִ֣ישׁ תְּבוּנָֽה׃	It is as sport to a fool to do wickedness, And so is wisdom to a man of discernment.
24	מְגוֹרַ֣ת רָ֭שָׁע הִ֣יא תְבוֹאֶ֑נּוּ וְתַאֲוַ֖ת צַדִּיקִ֣ים יִתֵּֽן׃	The fear of the wicked, it shall come upon him; And the desire of the righteous shall be granted.
25	כַּעֲב֣וֹר ס֭וּפָה וְאֵ֣ין רָשָׁ֑ע וְ֝צַדִּ֗יק יְס֣וֹד עוֹלָֽם׃	When the whirlwind passeth, the wicked is no more; But the righteous is an everlasting foundation.
26	כַּחֹ֤מֶץ ׀ לַשִּׁנַּ֗יִם וְכֶעָשָׁ֥ן לָעֵינָ֑יִם כֵּ֥ן הֶ֝עָצֵ֗ל לְשֹׁלְחָֽיו׃	As vinegar to the teeth, and as smoke to the eyes, So is the sluggard to them that send him.
27	יִרְאַ֣ת יְ֭הֹוָה תּוֹסִ֣יף יָמִ֑ים וּשְׁנ֖וֹת רְשָׁעִ֣ים תִּקְצֹֽרְנָה׃	The fear of the LORD prolongeth days; But the years of the wicked shall be shortened.
28	תּוֹחֶ֣לֶת צַדִּיקִ֣ים שִׂמְחָ֑ה וְתִקְוַ֖ת רְשָׁעִ֣ים תֹּאבֵֽד׃	The hope of the righteous is gladness; But the expectation of the wicked shall perish.
29	מָע֣וֹז לַ֭תֹּם דֶּ֣רֶךְ יְהֹוָ֑ה וּ֝מְחִתָּ֗ה לְפֹ֣עֲלֵי אָֽוֶן׃	The way of the LORD is a stronghold to the upright, But ruin to the workers of iniquity.
30	צַ֭דִּיק לְעוֹלָ֣ם בַּל־יִמּ֑וֹט וּ֝רְשָׁעִ֗ים לֹ֣א יִשְׁכְּנוּ־אָֽרֶץ׃	The righteous shall never be moved; But the wicked shall not inhabit the land.
31	פִּֽי־צַ֭דִּיק יָנ֣וּב חׇכְמָ֑ה וּלְשׁ֥וֹן תַּ֝הְפֻּכ֗וֹת תִּכָּרֵֽת׃	The mouth of the righteous buddeth with wisdom; But the froward tongue shall be cut off.
32	שִׂפְתֵ֣י צַ֭דִּיק יֵדְע֣וּן רָצ֑וֹן וּפִ֥י רְ֝שָׁעִ֗ים תַּהְפֻּכֽוֹת׃	The lips of the righteous know what is acceptable; But the mouth of the wicked is all frowardness.

=== Textual witnesses ===
Some early manuscripts containing the text of this chapter in Hebrew are of the Masoretic Text, which includes the Aleppo Codex (10th century), and Codex Leningradensis (1008). Fragments containing parts of this chapter in Hebrew were found among the Dead Sea Scrolls including 4Q103 (4QProv^{b}; 30 BCE – 30 CE) with extant verses 30–32.

There is also a translation into Koine Greek known as the Septuagint, made in the last few centuries BC. Extant ancient manuscripts of the Septuagint version include Codex Vaticanus (B; $\mathfrak{G}$^{B}; 4th century), Codex Sinaiticus (S; BHK: $\mathfrak{G}$^{S}; 4th century), and Codex Alexandrinus (A; $\mathfrak{G}$^{A}; 5th century).

== Analysis ==
This chapter belongs to a section regarded as the second collection in the book of Proverbs (comprising Proverbs 10:1–22:16), also called "The First 'Solomonic' Collection" (the second one in Proverbs 25:1–29:27). The collection contains 375 sayings (375 is the numerical value of the Hebrew name "Solomon"), each of which consists of two parallel phrases, except for Proverbs 19:7 which consists of three parts.

== Verse 1 ==
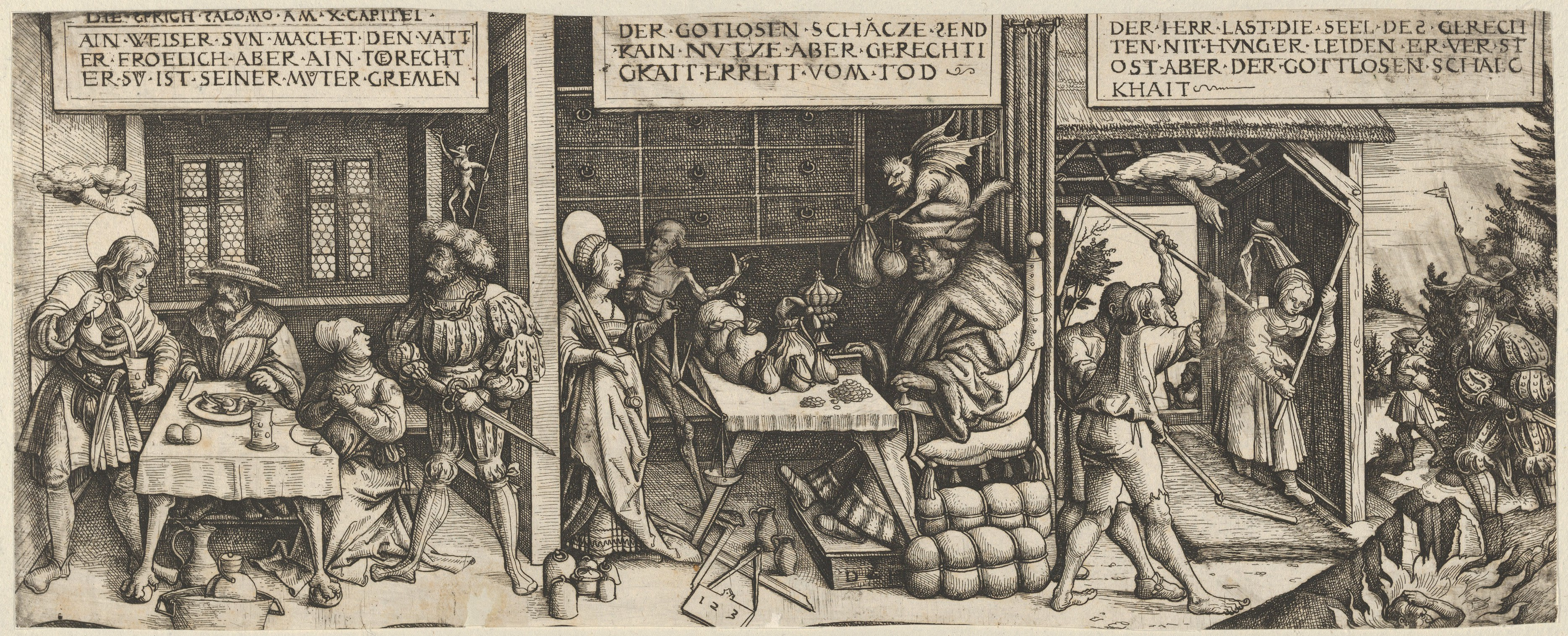
"Illustrations to Proverbs 10:1-3" by Daniel Hopfer (1470–1536) c. 1534

The proverbs of Solomon.
A wise son makes a glad father,

but a foolish son is the grief of his mother.

This verse opens a new, different section, following parental appeals in chapters 1–9, with a proverb observing the effect on parents of the wisdom or folly of their child (cf. Proverbs 15:20; 17:21, 25), that not only brings the joy or sorrow of parents, but also the family's reputation (cf. Proverbs 28:7) and prosperity (cf. Proverbs 29:3).

== Verse 15 ==
The rich man's wealth is his strong city:

the destruction of the poor is their poverty.

- "Strong city": that is, "fortified city"; a metaphor how wealth can protect its possessors against adversity, but only when such wealth is attained by diligence and righteous means (verse 2; cf. Proverbs 13:8; 18:11, 23; 22:7). On the other hand, the poor have no resources to fall back on, especially those who have only themselves to blame (verse 4).

== See also ==
- Charity
- Child discipline
- Creator deity
- Deception
- Discretion
- Divine providence
- Evil
- Fear of God
- Foolishness
- Humility
- Judgement
- Justice
- Knowledge
- Mercy
- Nephesh
- Omniscience
- Parenting
- Poverty
- Pride
- Prudence
- Relativism
- Reputation
- Righteousness
- Sin
- Soul in the Bible
- Truth
- Understanding
- Wealth
- Wickedness
- Wisdom
- YHWH
- Related Bible parts: Proverbs 9, Proverbs 22, Proverbs 28

== Sources ==
- Aitken, K. T. (2007). "19. Proverbs". In Barton, John; Muddiman, John (eds.). The Oxford Bible Commentary (first (paperback) ed.). Oxford University Press. pp. 405–422. ISBN 978-0199277186.
- Alter, Robert (2010). The Wisdom Books: Job, Proverbs, and Ecclesiastes: A Translation with Commentary. W.W. Norton & Co. ISBN 978-0393080735.
- Coogan, Michael David (2007). Coogan, Michael David; Brettler, Marc Zvi; Newsom, Carol Ann; Perkins, Pheme (eds.). The New Oxford Annotated Bible with the Apocryphal/Deuterocanonical Books: New Revised Standard Version, Issue 48 (Augmented 3rd ed.). Oxford University Press. ISBN 9780195288810.
- Farmer, Kathleen A. (1998). "The Wisdom Books". In McKenzie, Steven L.; Graham, Matt Patrick (eds.). The Hebrew Bible Today: An Introduction to Critical Issues. Westminster John Knox Press. ISBN 978-0-66425652-4.
- Fitzmyer, Joseph A. (2008). A Guide to the Dead Sea Scrolls and Related Literature. Grand Rapids, MI: William B. Eerdmans Publishing Company. ISBN 9780802862419.
- Fox, Michael V. (2009). Proverbs 10-31: A New Translation with Introduction and Commentary. Anchor Yale Bible Commentaries. Yale University Press. ISBN 978-0300155563.
- Halley, Henry H. (1965). Halley's Bible Handbook: an abbreviated Bible commentary (24th (revised) ed.). Zondervan Publishing House. ISBN 0-310-25720-4.
- Perdue, Leo G. (2012). Proverbs Interpretation: A Bible Commentary for Teaching and Preaching. Presbyterian Publishing Corporation. ISBN 978-0664238841.
- Ulrich, Eugene, ed. (2010). The Biblical Qumran Scrolls: Transcriptions and Textual Variants. Brill.
- Würthwein, Ernst (1995). The Text of the Old Testament. Translated by Rhodes, Erroll F. Grand Rapids, MI: Wm. B. Eerdmans. ISBN 0-8028-0788-7.
