= Wickedness =

Evil or sinfulness

Wickedness is generally considered a synonym for evil or sinfulness. Among theologians and philosophers, it has the more specific meaning of a profound evil committed consciously and of free will. It can also be considered the quality or state of being wicked.

As characterized by Martin Buber in his 1952 work Bilder von Gut und Böse (translated as Good and Evil: Two Interpretations), "The first stage of evil is 'sin,' occasional directionlessness. Endless possibility can be overwhelming, leading man to grasp at anything, distracting and busying himself, in order to not have to make a real, committed choice. The second stage of evil is 'wickedness,' when caprice is embraced as a deformed substitute for genuine will and becomes characteristic." Wickedness connotes blameworthiness.

== Etymology ==
The term wickedness dates back to the 1300s and is derived from the words wicked and -ness. Wicked is an extended form of the term wick meaning bad and is also associated with the Old English term wicca meaning a (male) witch. There is not a corresponding verb to the term, but the term wretched is also associated with the term. The term -ness is a word forming element denoting action, quality or state and is typically added to an adjective or past participle to make it an abstract noun. It is an Old English term and also comes from the Proto-Germanic term in-assu and many other cognates.

== Wickedness and power ==
Throughout history power is typically seen to be a very dangerous and destructive element in people's lives. It is a cancer to society or is wicked if you will. Some theorists believe that power itself is actually in fact morally neutral. It is the results of power that determine whether or not power is seen as good. The people in power are then also seen as not wicked in their nature, but rather the urgency for power and within the nature of it is what makes power seen as a wicked idea. Theorists believe that if men were the wicked ones in the equation then the solution to the issues at stake would be ethical improvement. In the end, it isn't power or man that are wicked, but the results of power that cause it to be wicked.

== Causes ==
There are two different types of wickedness that some people will argue. There is natural wickedness. This is the type of wickedness that is unpreventable such as earthquakes, tornadoes and other types of natural disasters. The second type of wickedness is moral wickedness. This type of wickedness is types of evil that are acted out by humans and can arguably be preventable. What causes the separation between the two is the response to both types of wickedness. During a natural disaster people tend to be sympathetic to the victims of the destruction. It is this sympathy to the victims that classifies a natural disaster as a form of wickedness. In contrast, to moral wickedness where people will be sympathetic to the victim of the person who committed the wicked behavior. This distinguishes the person who committed the act as a wicked being. It is based on the modern consciousness of society that determines whether the act is considered wicked.

== See also ==
- Concupiscence
- Original sin
