= Proverbs 14 =

Fourteenth chapter of the biblical book of Proverbs

- ← chapter 13 chapter 15 →
- The whole Book of Proverbs in the Leningrad Codex (1008 C.E.) from an old facsimile edition.
- Book: Book of Proverbs
- Category: Ketuvim
- Christian Bible part: Old Testament
- Order in the Christian part: 21

Proverbs 14 is the fourteenth chapter of the Book of Proverbs in the Hebrew Bible or the Old Testament of the Christian Bible. The book is a compilation of several wisdom literature collections: the heading in Proverbs 1:1 may be intended to portray Solomon as the traditional author of the whole book, but the dates of the individual collections are difficult to determine, and the book probably obtained its final shape in the post-exilic period. This chapter is a part of the second collection of the book.

== Text ==
=== Hebrew ===
The following table shows the Hebrew text of Proverbs 14 with vowels alongside an English translation based upon the JPS 1917 translation (now in the public domain).

| Verse | Hebrew | English translation (JPS 1917) |
|---|---|---|
| 1 | חַכְמ֣וֹת נָ֭שִׁים בָּנְתָ֣ה בֵיתָ֑הּ וְ֝אִוֶּ֗לֶת בְּיָדֶ֥יהָ תֶהֶרְסֶֽנּוּ׃ | Every wise woman buildeth her house; But the foolish plucketh it down with her hands. |
| 2 | הוֹלֵ֣ךְ בְּ֭יׇשְׁרוֹ יְרֵ֣א יְהֹוָ֑ה וּנְל֖וֹז דְּרָכָ֣יו בּוֹזֵֽהוּ׃ | He that walketh in his uprightness feareth the LORD; But he that is perverse in his ways despiseth Him. |
| 3 | בְּֽפִי־אֱ֭וִיל חֹ֣טֶר גַּאֲוָ֑ה וְשִׂפְתֵ֥י חֲ֝כָמִ֗ים תִּשְׁמוּרֵֽם׃ | In the mouth of the foolish is a rod of pride; But the lips of the wise shall preserve them. . |
| 4 | בְּאֵ֣ין אֲ֭לָפִים אֵב֣וּס בָּ֑ר וְרׇב־תְּ֝בוּא֗וֹת בְּכֹ֣חַ שֽׁוֹר׃ | Where no oxen are, the crib is clean; But much increase is by the strength of the ox. |
| 5 | עֵ֣ד אֱ֭מוּנִים לֹ֣א יְכַזֵּ֑ב וְיָפִ֥יחַ כְּ֝זָבִ֗ים עֵ֣ד שָֽׁקֶר׃ | A faithful witness will not lie; But a false witness breatheth forth lies. |
| 6 | בִּקֶּשׁ־לֵ֣ץ חׇכְמָ֣ה וָאָ֑יִן וְדַ֖עַת לְנָב֣וֹן נָקָֽל׃ | A scorner seeketh wisdom, and findeth it not; But knowledge is easy unto him that hath discernment. |
| 7 | לֵ֣ךְ מִ֭נֶּגֶד לְאִ֣ישׁ כְּסִ֑יל וּבַל־יָ֝דַ֗עְתָּ שִׂפְתֵי־דָֽעַת׃ | Go from the presence of a foolish man, for thou wilt not perceive the lips of knowledge. |
| 8 | חׇכְמַ֣ת עָ֭רוּם הָבִ֣ין דַּרְכּ֑וֹ וְאִוֶּ֖לֶת כְּסִילִ֣ים מִרְמָֽה׃ | The wisdom of the prudent is to look well to his way; But the folly of fools is deceit. |
| 9 | אֱ֭וִלִים יָלִ֣יץ אָשָׁ֑ם וּבֵ֖ין יְשָׁרִ֣ים רָצֽוֹן׃ | Amends pleadeth for fools; But among the upright there is good will. |
| 10 | לֵ֗ב י֭וֹדֵעַ מָרַּ֣ת נַפְשׁ֑וֹ וּ֝בְשִׂמְחָת֗וֹ לֹא־יִתְעָ֥רַב זָֽר׃ | The heart knoweth its own bitterness; And with its joy no stranger can intermeddle. |
| 11 | בֵּ֣ית רְ֭שָׁעִים יִשָּׁמֵ֑ד וְאֹ֖הֶל יְשָׁרִ֣ים יַפְרִֽיחַ׃ | The house of the wicked shall be overthrown; But the tent of the upright shall flourish. |
| 12 | יֵ֤שׁ דֶּ֣רֶךְ יָ֭שָׁר לִפְנֵי־אִ֑ישׁ וְ֝אַחֲרִיתָ֗הּ דַּרְכֵי־מָֽוֶת׃ | There is a way which seemeth right unto a man, But the end thereof are the ways of death. |
| 13 | גַּם־בִּשְׂחֹ֥ק יִכְאַב־לֵ֑ב וְאַחֲרִיתָ֖הּ שִׂמְחָ֣ה תוּגָֽה׃ | Even in laughter the heart acheth; And the end of mirth is heaviness. |
| 14 | מִדְּרָכָ֣יו יִ֭שְׂבַּע ס֣וּג לֵ֑ב וּ֝מֵעָלָ֗יו אִ֣ישׁ טֽוֹב׃ | The dissembler in heart shall have his fill from his own ways; And a good man shall be satisfied from himself. |
| 15 | פֶּ֭תִי יַאֲמִ֣ין לְכׇל־דָּבָ֑ר וְ֝עָר֗וּם יָבִ֥ין לַאֲשֻׁרֽוֹ׃ | The thoughtless believeth every word; But the prudent man looketh well to his going. |
| 16 | חָכָ֣ם יָ֭רֵא וְסָ֣ר מֵרָ֑ע וּ֝כְסִ֗יל מִתְעַבֵּ֥ר וּבוֹטֵֽחַ׃ | A wise man feareth, and departeth from evil; But the fool behaveth overbearingly, and is confident. |
| 17 | קְֽצַר־אַ֭פַּיִם יַעֲשֶׂ֣ה אִוֶּ֑לֶת וְאִ֥ישׁ מְ֝זִמּ֗וֹת יִשָּׂנֵֽא׃ | He that is soon angry dealeth foolishly; And a man of wicked devices is hated. |
| 18 | נָחֲל֣וּ פְתָאיִ֣ם אִוֶּ֑לֶת וַ֝עֲרוּמִ֗ים יַכְתִּ֥רוּ דָֽעַת׃ | The thoughtless come into possession of folly; But the prudent are crowned with knowledge. |
| 19 | שַׁח֣וּ רָ֭עִים לִפְנֵ֣י טוֹבִ֑ים וּ֝רְשָׁעִ֗ים עַֽל־שַׁעֲרֵ֥י צַדִּֽיק׃ | The evil bow before the good, And the wicked at the gates of the righteous. |
| 20 | גַּם־לְ֭רֵעֵהוּ יִשָּׂ֣נֵא רָ֑שׁ וְאֹהֲבֵ֖י עָשִׁ֣יר רַבִּֽים׃ | The poor is hated even of his own neighbour; But the rich hath many friends. . |
| 21 | בׇּז־לְרֵעֵ֥הוּ חוֹטֵ֑א וּמְחוֹנֵ֖ן (עניים) [עֲנָוִ֣ים] אַשְׁרָֽיו׃ | He that despiseth his neighbour sinneth; But he that is gracious unto the humble, happy is he. |
| 22 | הֲֽלוֹא־יִ֭תְעוּ חֹ֣רְשֵׁי רָ֑ע וְחֶ֥סֶד וֶ֝אֱמֶ֗ת חֹ֣רְשֵׁי טֽוֹב׃ | Shall they not go astray that devise evil? But mercy and truth shall be for them that devise good. |
| 23 | בְּכׇל־עֶ֭צֶב יִהְיֶ֣ה מוֹתָ֑ר וּדְבַר־שְׂ֝פָתַ֗יִם אַךְ־לְמַחְסֽוֹר׃ | In all labour there is profit; But the talk of the lips tendeth only to penury. |
| 24 | עֲטֶ֣רֶת חֲכָמִ֣ים עׇשְׁרָ֑ם אִוֶּ֖לֶת כְּסִילִ֣ים אִוֶּֽלֶת׃ | The crown of the wise is their riches; But the folly of fools remaineth folly. |
| 25 | מַצִּ֣יל נְ֭פָשׁוֹת עֵ֣ד אֱמֶ֑ת וְיָפִ֖חַ כְּזָבִ֣ים מִרְמָֽה׃ | A true witness delivereth souls; But he that breatheth forth lies is all deceit. |
| 26 | בְּיִרְאַ֣ת יְ֭הֹוָה מִבְטַח־עֹ֑ז וּ֝לְבָנָ֗יו יִהְיֶ֥ה מַחְסֶֽה׃ | In the fear of the LORD a man hath strong confidence; And his children shall have a place of refuge. |
| 27 | רְאַ֣ת יְ֭הֹוָה מְק֣וֹר חַיִּ֑ים לָ֝ס֗וּר מִמֹּ֥קְשֵׁי מָֽוֶת׃ | The fear of the LORD is a fountain of life, to depart from the snares of death. |
| 28 | בְּרׇב־עָ֥ם הַדְרַת־מֶ֑לֶךְ וּבְאֶ֥פֶס לְ֝אֹ֗ם מְחִתַּ֥ת רָזֽוֹן׃ | In the multitude of people is the king's glory; But in the want of people is the ruin of the prince. |
| 29 | אֶ֣רֶךְ אַ֭פַּיִם רַב־תְּבוּנָ֑ה וּקְצַר־ר֝֗וּחַ מֵרִ֥ים אִוֶּֽלֶת׃ | He that is slow to anger is of great understanding; But he that is hasty of spirit exalteth folly. |
| 30 | חַיֵּ֣י בְ֭שָׂרִים לֵ֣ב מַרְפֵּ֑א וּרְקַ֖ב עֲצָמ֣וֹת קִנְאָֽה׃ | A tranquil heart is the life of the flesh; But envy is the rottenness of the bones. |
| 31 | עֹ֣שֵֽׁק דָּ֭ל חֵרֵ֣ף עֹשֵׂ֑הוּ וּ֝מְכַבְּד֗וֹ חֹנֵ֥ן אֶבְיֽוֹן׃ | He that oppresseth the poor blasphemeth his Maker; But he that is gracious unto the needy honoureth Him. |
| 32 | בְּֽ֭רָעָתוֹ יִדָּחֶ֣ה רָשָׁ֑ע וְחֹסֶ֖ה בְמוֹת֣וֹ צַדִּֽיק׃ | The wicked is thrust down in his misfortune; But the righteous, even when he is brought to death, hath hope. |
| 33 | בְּלֵ֣ב נָ֭בוֹן תָּנ֣וּחַ חׇכְמָ֑ה וּבְקֶ֥רֶב כְּ֝סִילִ֗ים תִּוָּדֵֽעַ׃ | In the heart of him that hath discernment wisdom resteth; But in the inward part of fools it maketh itself known. |
| 34 | צְדָקָ֥ה תְרוֹמֵֽם־גּ֑וֹי וְחֶ֖סֶד לְאֻמִּ֣ים חַטָּֽאת׃ | Righteousness exalteth a nation; But sin is a reproach to any people. |
| 35 | רְֽצוֹן־מֶ֭לֶךְ לְעֶ֣בֶד מַשְׂכִּ֑יל וְ֝עֶבְרָת֗וֹ תִּהְיֶ֥ה מֵבִֽישׁ׃ | The king's favour is toward a servant that dealeth wisely; But his wrath striketh him that dealeth shamefully. |

=== Textual witnesses ===
Some early manuscripts containing the text of this chapter in Hebrew are of the Masoretic Text, which includes the Aleppo Codex (10th century), and Codex Leningradensis (1008). Fragments containing parts of this chapter in Hebrew were found among the Dead Sea Scrolls including 4Q103 (4QProv^{b}; 30 BCE – 30 CE) with extant verses 5–10, 12–13, 31–35.

There is also a translation into Koine Greek known as the Septuagint, made in the last few centuries BC. Extant ancient manuscripts of the Septuagint version include Codex Vaticanus (B; $\mathfrak{G}$^{B}; 4th century), Codex Sinaiticus (S; BHK: $\mathfrak{G}$^{S}; 4th century), and Codex Alexandrinus (A; $\mathfrak{G}$^{A}; 5th century).

== Analysis ==
This chapter belongs to a section regarded as the second collection in the book of Proverbs (comprising Proverbs 10:1–22:16), also called "The First 'Solomonic' Collection" (the second one in Proverbs 25:1–29:27). The collection contains 375 sayings, each of which consists of two parallel phrases, except for Proverbs 19:7 which consists of three parts.

== Verse 1 ==
Every wise woman builds her house,

but the foolish pulls it down with her hands.

"Every wise woman" is from the Hebrew construct phrase חַכְמוֹת נָשִׁים, khakhmot nashim, "wise ones of women"; with the plural noun נָשִׁים, nashim, functions in a distributive sense ("every"), as this is followed by a singular feminine verb בָּנְתָה, banetah ("builds"). This verse contrasts the wise and foolish women (cf. Proverbs 7:10–23; 31:10–31), but may also be making much the same point as the personified Wisdom building her house in Proverbs 9:1 as the antithesis of Folly and her house in 9:14. Alternative wording is found in the Good News Translation:

Homes are made by the wisdom of women, but are destroyed by foolishness.

== Verse 12 ==
There is a way that seems right to a man,

but its end is the way to death.

The words of Proverbs 16:25 are the same.

== Verse 30 ==
A sound heart is the life of the flesh:

but envy the rottenness of the bones.

- "Sound": an attributive adjective from the Hebrew genitive noun מַרְפֵּא, marpeʾ, which may be one meaning of two homonyms:

- 1 "healing", from the root רָפָא, raphaʾ, "to heal";
- 2 "calmness, gentleness”, from the root רָפָה, raphah, "to be slack, loose".

- "Envy": from the Hebrew term קִנְאָה, qinʾah, "passion" (NRSV), “jealousy” (NAB, NCV, TEV, NLT), a fairly general word for deep emotion of passionate zeal, including envy and jealousy (Proverbs 6:34; 27:4) as well as anger. In a positive sense, it can be a zeal to defend the institutions of the sanctuary, but in a negative sense it can be an 'intense and sometimes violent excitement and desire that is never satisfied'.

This saying correlates the effect of one's state of the mind on the health of one's whole body (cf. Proverbs 3:8).

== See also ==
- Alcohol in the Bible
- Charity
- Creator deity
- Divine providence
- Evil
- Fear of God
- Mitzvah
- Nephesh
- Omniscience
- Relativism
- Sin
- Soul in the Bible
- YHWH
- Related Bible parts: Proverbs 9, Proverbs 16, Proverbs 31

== Sources ==
- Aitken, K. T. (2007). "19. Proverbs". In Barton, John; Muddiman, John (eds.). The Oxford Bible Commentary (first (paperback) ed.). Oxford University Press. pp. 405–422. ISBN 978-0199277186.
- Alter, Robert (2010). The Wisdom Books: Job, Proverbs, and Ecclesiastes: A Translation with Commentary. W.W. Norton & Co. ISBN 978-0393080735.
- Coogan, Michael David (2007). Coogan, Michael David; Brettler, Marc Zvi; Newsom, Carol Ann; Perkins, Pheme (eds.). The New Oxford Annotated Bible with the Apocryphal/Deuterocanonical Books: New Revised Standard Version, Issue 48 (Augmented 3rd ed.). Oxford University Press. ISBN 9780195288810.
- Farmer, Kathleen A. (1998). "The Wisdom Books". In McKenzie, Steven L.; Graham, Matt Patrick (eds.). The Hebrew Bible Today: An Introduction to Critical Issues. Westminster John Knox Press. ISBN 978-0-66425652-4.
- Fitzmyer, Joseph A. (2008). A Guide to the Dead Sea Scrolls and Related Literature. Grand Rapids, MI: William B. Eerdmans Publishing Company. ISBN 9780802862419.
- Fox, Michael V. (2009). Proverbs 10-31: A New Translation with Introduction and Commentary. Anchor Yale Bible Commentaries. Yale University Press. ISBN 978-0300155563.
- Halley, Henry H. (1965). Halley's Bible Handbook: an abbreviated Bible commentary (24th (revised) ed.). Zondervan Publishing House. ISBN 0-310-25720-4.
- Perdue, Leo G. (2012). Proverbs Interpretation: A Bible Commentary for Teaching and Preaching. Presbyterian Publishing Corporation. ISBN 978-0664238841.
- Ulrich, Eugene, ed. (2010). The Biblical Qumran Scrolls: Transcriptions and Textual Variants. Brill.
- Würthwein, Ernst (1995). The Text of the Old Testament. Translated by Rhodes, Erroll F. Grand Rapids, MI: Wm. B. Eerdmans. ISBN 0-8028-0788-7.
