= Proverbs 15 =

Fifteenth chapter of the biblical book of Proverbs

- ← chapter 14 chapter 16 →
- The whole Book of Proverbs in the Leningrad Codex (1008 C.E.) from an old facsimile edition.
- Book: Book of Proverbs
- Category: Ketuvim
- Christian Bible part: Old Testament
- Order in the Christian part: 21

Proverbs 15 is the fifteenth chapter of the Book of Proverbs in the Hebrew Bible or the Old Testament of the Christian Bible. The book is a compilation of several wisdom literature collections, with the heading in 1:1 may be intended to regard Solomon as the traditional author of the whole book, but the dates of the individual collections are difficult to determine, and the book probably obtained its final shape in the post-exilic period. This chapter is a part of the second collection of the book.

== Text ==
=== Hebrew ===
The following table shows the Hebrew text of Proverbs 15 with vowels alongside an English translation based upon the JPS 1917 translation (now in the public domain).

Verse	Hebrew	English translation (JPS 1917)
1	מַֽעֲנֶה־רַּ֭ךְ יָשִׁ֣יב חֵמָ֑ה וּדְבַר־עֶ֝֗צֶב יַעֲלֶה־אָֽף׃	A soft answer turneth away wrath; But a grievous word stirreth up anger.
2	לְשׁ֣וֹן חֲ֭כָמִים תֵּיטִ֣יב דָּ֑עַת וּפִ֥י כְ֝סִילִ֗ים יַבִּ֥יעַ אִוֶּֽלֶת׃	The tongue of the wise useth knowledge aright; But the mouth of fools poureth out foolishness.
3	בְּֽכׇל־מָ֭קוֹם עֵינֵ֣י יְהֹוָ֑ה צֹ֝פ֗וֹת רָעִ֥ים וְטוֹבִֽים׃	The eyes of the LORD are in every place, Keeping watch upon the evil and the good.
4	מַרְפֵּ֣א לָ֭שׁוֹן עֵ֣ץ חַיִּ֑ים וְסֶ֥לֶף בָּ֝֗הּ שֶׁ֣בֶר בְּרֽוּחַ׃	A soothing tongue is a tree of life; But perverseness therein is a wound to the spirit.
5	אֱוִ֗יל יִ֭נְאַץ מוּסַ֣ר אָבִ֑יו וְשֹׁמֵ֖ר תּוֹכַ֣חַת יַעְרִֽים׃	A fool despiseth his father's correction; But he that regardeth reproof is prudent.
6	בֵּ֣ית צַ֭דִּיק חֹ֣סֶן רָ֑ב וּבִתְבוּאַ֖ת רָשָׁ֣ע נֶעְכָּֽרֶת׃	In the house of the righteous is much treasure; But in the revenues of the wicked is trouble.
7	שִׂפְתֵ֣י חֲ֭כָמִים יְזָ֣רוּ דָ֑עַת וְלֵ֖ב כְּסִילִ֣ים לֹא־כֵֽן׃	The lips of the wise disperse knowledge; But the heart of the foolish is not stedfast.
8	זֶ֣בַח רְ֭שָׁעִים תּוֹעֲבַ֣ת יְהֹוָ֑ה וּתְפִלַּ֖ת יְשָׁרִ֣ים רְצוֹנֽוֹ׃	The sacrifice of the wicked is an abomination to the LORD; But the prayer of the upright is His delight.
9	תּוֹעֲבַ֣ת יְ֭הֹוָה דֶּ֣רֶךְ רָשָׁ֑ע וּמְרַדֵּ֖ף צְדָקָ֣ה יֶאֱהָֽב׃	The way of the wicked is an abomination to the LORD; But He loveth him that followeth after righteousness.
10	מוּסָ֣ר רָ֭ע לְעֹזֵ֣ב אֹ֑רַח שׂוֹנֵ֖א תוֹכַ֣חַת יָמֽוּת׃	There is grievous correction for him that forsaketh the way; And he that hateth reproof shall die.
11	שְׁא֣וֹל וַ֭אֲבַדּוֹן נֶ֣גֶד יְהֹוָ֑ה אַ֝֗ף כִּֽי־לִבּ֥וֹת בְּֽנֵי־אָדָֽם׃	The nether-world and Destruction are before the LORD; How much more then the hearts of the children of men
12	לֹ֣א יֶאֱהַב־לֵ֭ץ הוֹכֵ֣חַֽ ל֑וֹ אֶל־חֲ֝כָמִ֗ים לֹ֣א יֵלֵֽךְ׃	A scorner loveth not to be reproved; He will not go unto the wise.
13	לֵ֣ב שָׂ֭מֵחַ יֵיטִ֣ב פָּנִ֑ים וּבְעַצְּבַת־לֵ֝֗ב ר֣וּחַ נְכֵאָֽה׃	A merry heart maketh a cheerful countenance; But by sorrow of heart the spirit is broken.
14	לֵ֣ב נָ֭בוֹן יְבַקֶּשׁ־דָּ֑עַת (ופני) [וּפִ֥י] כְ֝סִילִ֗ים יִרְעֶ֥ה אִוֶּֽלֶת׃	The heart of him that hath discernment seeketh knowledge; But the mouth of fools feedeth on folly.
15	כׇּל־יְמֵ֣י עָנִ֣י רָעִ֑ים וְטֽוֹב־לֵ֝֗ב מִשְׁתֶּ֥ה תָמִֽיד׃	All the days of the poor are evil; But he that is of a merry heart hath a continual feast.
16	טוֹב־מְ֭עַט בְּיִרְאַ֣ת יְהֹוָ֑ה מֵאוֹצָ֥ר רָ֝֗ב וּמְה֥וּמָה בֽוֹ׃	Better is little with the fear of the LORD, Than great treasure and turmoil therewith.
17	ט֤וֹב אֲרֻחַ֣ת יָ֭רָק וְאַהֲבָה־שָׁ֑ם מִשּׁ֥וֹר אָ֝ב֗וּס וְשִׂנְאָה־בֽוֹ׃	Better is a dinner of herbs where love is, Than a stalled ox and hatred therewith.
18	אִ֣ישׁ חֵ֭מָה יְגָרֶ֣ה מָד֑וֹן וְאֶ֥רֶךְ אַ֝פַּ֗יִם יַשְׁקִ֥יט רִֽיב׃	A wrathful man stirreth up discord; But he that is slow to anger appeaseth strife.
19	דֶּ֣רֶךְ עָ֭צֵל כִּמְשֻׂ֣כַת חָ֑דֶק וְאֹ֖רַח יְשָׁרִ֣ים סְלֻלָֽה׃	The way of the sluggard is as though hedged by thorns; But the path of the upright is even.
20	בֵּ֣ן חָ֭כָם יְשַׂמַּח־אָ֑ב וּכְסִ֥יל אָ֝דָ֗ם בּוֹזֶ֥ה אִמּֽוֹ׃	A wise son maketh a glad father; But a foolish man despiseth his mother.
21	אִ֭וֶּלֶת שִׂמְחָ֣ה לַחֲסַר־לֵ֑ב וְאִ֥ישׁ תְּ֝בוּנָ֗ה יְיַשֶּׁר־לָֽכֶת׃	Folly is joy to him that lacketh understanding; But a man of discernment walketh straightforwards.
22	הָפֵ֣ר מַ֭חֲשָׁבוֹת בְּאֵ֣ין ס֑וֹד וּבְרֹ֖ב יוֹעֲצִ֣ים תָּקֽוּם׃	For want of counsel purposes are frustrated; But in the multitude of counsellors they are established.
23	שִׂמְחָ֣ה לָ֭אִישׁ בְּמַעֲנֵה־פִ֑יו וְדָבָ֖ר בְּעִתּ֣וֹ מַה־טּֽוֹב׃	A man hath joy in the answer of his mouth; And a word in due season, how good is it!
24	אֹ֣רַח חַ֭יִּים לְמַ֣עְלָה לְמַשְׂכִּ֑יל לְמַ֥עַן ס֝֗וּר מִשְּׁא֥וֹל מָֽטָּה׃	The path of life goeth upward for the wise, that he may depart from the nether-world beneath.
25	בֵּ֣ית גֵּ֭אִים יִסַּ֥ח ׀ יְהֹוָ֑ה וְ֝יַצֵּ֗ב גְּב֣וּל אַלְמָנָֽה׃	The LORD will pluck up the house of the proud; But He will establish the border of the widow
26	תּוֹעֲבַ֣ת יְ֭הֹוָה מַחְשְׁב֣וֹת רָ֑ע וּ֝טְהֹרִ֗ים אִמְרֵי־נֹֽעַם׃	The thoughts of wickedness are an abomination to the LORD; But words of pleasantness are pure.
27	עֹכֵ֣ר בֵּ֭יתוֹ בּוֹצֵ֣עַ בָּ֑צַע וְשׂוֹנֵ֖א מַתָּנֹ֣ת יִחְיֶֽה׃	He that is greedy of gain troubleth his own house; But he that hateth gifts shall live.
28	לֵ֣ב צַ֭דִּיק יֶהְגֶּ֣ה לַעֲנ֑וֹת וּפִ֥י רְ֝שָׁעִ֗ים יַבִּ֥יעַ רָעֽוֹת׃	The heart of the righteous studieth to answer; But the mouth of the wicked poureth out evil things.
29	רָח֣וֹק יְ֭הֹוָה מֵרְשָׁעִ֑ים וּתְפִלַּ֖ת צַדִּיקִ֣ים יִשְׁמָֽע׃	The LORD is far from the wicked; But He heareth the prayer of the righteous.
30	מְֽאוֹר־עֵ֭ינַיִם יְשַׂמַּֽח־לֵ֑ב שְׁמוּעָ֥ה ט֝וֹבָ֗ה תְּדַשֶּׁן־עָֽצֶם׃	The light of the eyes rejoiceth the heart; And a good report maketh the bones fat.
31	אֹ֗זֶן שֹׁ֭מַעַת תּוֹכַ֣חַת חַיִּ֑ים בְּקֶ֖רֶב חֲכָמִ֣ים תָּלִֽין׃	The ear that hearkeneth to the reproof of life abideth among the wise.
32	פּוֹרֵ֣עַ מ֭וּסָר מוֹאֵ֣ס נַפְשׁ֑וֹ וְשׁוֹמֵ֥עַ תּ֝וֹכַ֗חַת ק֣וֹנֶה לֵּֽב׃	He that refuseth correction despiseth his own soul; But he that hearkeneth to reproof getteth understanding.
33	יִרְאַ֣ת יְ֭הֹוָה מוּסַ֣ר חׇכְמָ֑ה וְלִפְנֵ֖י כָב֣וֹד עֲנָוָֽה׃	The fear of the LORD is the instruction of wisdom; And before honour goeth humility.

=== Textual witnesses ===
Some early manuscripts containing the text of this chapter in Hebrew are of the Masoretic Text, which includes the Aleppo Codex (10th century), and Codex Leningradensis (1008). Fragments containing parts of this chapter in Hebrew were found among the Dead Sea Scrolls including 4Q103 (4QProv^{b}; 30 BCE – 30 CE) with extant verses 1–8, 19–31.

There is also a translation into Koine Greek known as the Septuagint, made in the last few centuries BC. Extant ancient manuscripts of the Septuagint version include Codex Vaticanus (B; $\mathfrak{G}$^{B}; 4th century), Codex Sinaiticus (S; BHK: $\mathfrak{G}$^{S}; 4th century), and Codex Alexandrinus (A; $\mathfrak{G}$^{A}; 5th century).

== Analysis ==
This chapter belongs to a section regarded as the second collection in the book of Proverbs (comprising Proverbs 10:1–22:16), also called "The First 'Solomonic' Collection" (the second one in Proverbs 25:1–29:27). The collection contains 375 sayings, each of which consists of two parallel phrases, except for Proverbs 19:7 which consists of three parts.

== Verse 1 ==
A soft answer turns away wrath,

but a harsh word stirs up anger.

- "Soft”: from the Hebrew adjective רַךְ, rakh, "soft; tender; gentle”; in conjunction to an "answer" provides a meaning of 'more than a mild response' but 'conciliatory response that restores good temper and reasonableness', as illustrated by Gideon in his answer (Judges 8:1-3) that brings peace.
- "Harsh": from the Hebrew noun עֶצֶב, ʿetsev, “pain, hurt” that functions as an attributive genitive referring to 'something that causes pain', as illustrated by Jephthah's harsh answer which led to war (Judges 12:1-6).

This verse contrasts a conciliatory reply that soothes a situation leading to reasoned discussion and the acrimonious reply that inflames a situation and makes intelligent discussion impossible.

== Verse 4 ==
A gentle tongue is a tree of life,

but perverseness in it breaks the spirit.

- "Gentle": in Hebrew literally, “a tongue of healing,” referring to 'speech that is therapeutic or soothing'.

This saying points that conciliatory or healing speech promotes life, in contrast with twisted or perverse speech, which may cause injury and bring death (cf. Proverbs 18:21).

== Verse 23 ==
A man has joy by the answer of his mouth,

and a word spoken in due season, how good it is!

- "The answer of his mouth": this term parallels to 'the good word spoken in season', so it would refer to "a proper or fitting answer".

This saying praises how a timely word brings satisfaction for both the speaker and the hearer(s), because words spoken out of "due season' would be ineffective and counter-productive.

== See also ==
- Alcohol in the Bible
- Charity
- Creator deity
- Divine providence
- Evil
- Fear of God
- Mercy
- Mitzvah
- Nephesh
- Omniscience
- Relativism
- Sin
- Soul in the Bible
- YHWH
- Related Bible parts: Deuteronomy 12, Proverbs 7, Proverbs 16, Proverbs 22

== Sources ==
- Aitken, K. T. (2007). "19. Proverbs". In Barton, John; Muddiman, John (eds.). The Oxford Bible Commentary (first (paperback) ed.). Oxford University Press. pp. 405–422. ISBN 978-0199277186.
- Alter, Robert (2010). The Wisdom Books: Job, Proverbs, and Ecclesiastes: A Translation with Commentary. W.W. Norton & Co. ISBN 978-0393080735.
- Coogan, Michael David (2007). Coogan, Michael David; Brettler, Marc Zvi; Newsom, Carol Ann; Perkins, Pheme (eds.). The New Oxford Annotated Bible with the Apocryphal/Deuterocanonical Books: New Revised Standard Version, Issue 48 (Augmented 3rd ed.). Oxford University Press. ISBN 9780195288810.
- Farmer, Kathleen A. (1998). "The Wisdom Books". In McKenzie, Steven L.; Graham, Matt Patrick (eds.). The Hebrew Bible Today: An Introduction to Critical Issues. Westminster John Knox Press. ISBN 978-0-66425652-4.
- Fitzmyer, Joseph A. (2008). A Guide to the Dead Sea Scrolls and Related Literature. Grand Rapids, MI: William B. Eerdmans Publishing Company. ISBN 9780802862419.
- Fox, Michael V. (2009). Proverbs 10-31: A New Translation with Introduction and Commentary. Anchor Yale Bible Commentaries. Yale University Press. ISBN 978-0300155563.
- Halley, Henry H. (1965). Halley's Bible Handbook: an abbreviated Bible commentary (24th (revised) ed.). Zondervan Publishing House. ISBN 0-310-25720-4.
- Perdue, Leo G. (2012). Proverbs Interpretation: A Bible Commentary for Teaching and Preaching. Presbyterian Publishing Corporation. ISBN 978-0664238841.
- Ulrich, Eugene, ed. (2010). The Biblical Qumran Scrolls: Transcriptions and Textual Variants. Brill.
- Würthwein, Ernst (1995). The Text of the Old Testament. Translated by Rhodes, Erroll F. Grand Rapids, MI: Wm. B. Eerdmans. ISBN 0-8028-0788-7.
