= Proverbs 13 =

Thirteenth chapter of the biblical book of Proverbs

- ← chapter 12 chapter 14 →
- The whole Book of Proverbs in the Leningrad Codex (1008 C.E.) from an old facsimile edition.
- Book: Book of Proverbs
- Category: Ketuvim
- Christian Bible part: Old Testament
- Order in the Christian part: 21

Proverbs 13 is the thirteenth chapter of the Book of Proverbs in the Hebrew Bible or the Old Testament of the Christian Bible. The book is a compilation of several wisdom literature collections, with the heading in 1:1 may be intended to regard Solomon as the traditional author of the whole book, but the dates of the individual collections are difficult to determine, and the book probably obtained its final shape in the post-exilic period. This chapter is a part of the second collection of the book.

== Text ==
=== Hebrew ===
The following table shows the Hebrew text of Proverbs 13 with vowels alongside an English translation based upon the JPS 1917 translation (now in the public domain).

Verse	Hebrew	English translation (JPS 1917)
1	בֵּ֣ן חָ֭כָם מ֣וּסַר אָ֑ב וְ֝לֵ֗ץ לֹא־שָׁמַ֥ע גְּעָרָֽה׃	A wise son is instructed of his father; But a scorner heareth not rebuke.
2	מִפְּרִ֣י פִי־אִ֭ישׁ יֹ֣אכַל ט֑וֹב וְנֶ֖פֶשׁ בֹּגְדִ֣ים חָמָֽס׃	A man shall eat good from the fruit of his mouth; But the desire of the faithless is violence.
3	נֹצֵ֣ר פִּ֭יו שֹׁמֵ֣ר נַפְשׁ֑וֹ פֹּשֵׂ֥ק שְׂ֝פָתָ֗יו מְחִתָּה־לֽוֹ׃	He that guardeth his mouth keepeth his life; But for him that openeth wide his lips there shall be ruin.
4	מִתְאַוָּ֣ה וָ֭אַיִן נַפְשׁ֣וֹ עָצֵ֑ל וְנֶ֖פֶשׁ חָרֻצִ֣ים תְּדֻשָּֽׁן׃	The soul of the sluggard desireth, and hath nothing; But the soul of the diligent shall be abundantly gratified.
5	דְּבַר־שֶׁ֭קֶר יִשְׂנָ֣א צַדִּ֑יק וְ֝רָשָׁ֗ע יַבְאִ֥ישׁ וְיַחְפִּֽיר׃	A righteous man hateth lying; But a wicked man behaveth vilely and shamefully.
6	צְ֭דָקָה תִּצֹּ֣ר תׇּם־דָּ֑רֶךְ וְ֝רִשְׁעָ֗ה תְּסַלֵּ֥ף חַטָּֽאת׃	Righteousness guardeth him that is upright in the way; But wickedness overthroweth the sinner.
7	יֵ֣שׁ מִ֭תְעַשֵּׁר וְאֵ֣ין כֹּ֑ל מִ֝תְרוֹשֵׁ֗שׁ וְה֣וֹן רָֽב׃	There is that pretendeth himself rich, yet hath nothing; There is that pretendeth himself poor, yet hath great wealth.
8	כֹּ֣פֶר נֶֽפֶשׁ־אִ֣ישׁ עׇשְׁר֑וֹ וְ֝רָ֗שׁ לֹֽא־שָׁמַ֥ע גְּעָרָֽה׃	The ransom of a man's life are his riches; But the poor heareth no threatening.
9	אוֹר־צַדִּיקִ֥ים יִשְׂמָ֑ח וְנֵ֖ר רְשָׁעִ֣ים יִדְעָֽךְ׃	The light of the righteous rejoiceth; But the lamp of the wicked shall be put out.
10	רַק־בְּ֭זָדוֹן יִתֵּ֣ן מַצָּ֑ה וְאֶת־נ֖וֹעָצִ֣ים חׇכְמָֽה׃	By pride cometh only contention; But with the well-advised is wisdom.
11	ה֭וֹן מֵהֶ֣בֶל יִמְעָ֑ט וְקֹבֵ֖ץ עַל־יָ֣ד יַרְבֶּֽה׃	Wealth gotten by vanity shall be diminished; But he that gathereth little by little shall increase. .
12	תּוֹחֶ֣לֶת מְ֭מֻשָּׁכָה מַחֲלָה־לֵ֑ב וְעֵ֥ץ חַ֝יִּ֗ים תַּאֲוָ֥ה בָאָֽה׃	Hope deferred maketh the heart sick; But desire fulfilled is a tree of life.
13	בָּ֣ז לְ֭דָבָר יֵחָ֣בֶל ל֑וֹ וִירֵ֥א מִ֝צְוָ֗ה ה֣וּא יְשֻׁלָּֽם׃	Whoso despiseth the word shall suffer thereby; But he that feareth the commandment shall be rewarded.
14	תּוֹרַ֣ת חָ֭כָם מְק֣וֹר חַיִּ֑ים לָ֝ס֗וּר מִמֹּ֥קְשֵׁי מָֽוֶת׃	The teaching of the wise is a fountain of life, To depart from the snares of death.
15	שֵֽׂכֶל־ט֭וֹב יִתֶּן־חֵ֑ן וְדֶ֖רֶךְ בֹּגְדִ֣ים אֵיתָֽן׃	Good understanding giveth grace; But the way of the faithless is harsh.
16	כׇּל־עָ֭רוּם יַעֲשֶׂ֣ה בְדָ֑עַת וּ֝כְסִ֗יל יִפְרֹ֥שׂ אִוֶּֽלֶת׃	Every prudent man dealeth with forethought; But a fool unfoldeth folly.
17	מַלְאָ֣ךְ רָ֭שָׁע יִפֹּ֣ל בְּרָ֑ע וְצִ֖יר אֱמוּנִ֣ים מַרְפֵּֽא׃	A wicked messenger falleth into evil; But a faithful ambassador is health.
18	רֵ֣ישׁ וְ֭קָלוֹן פּוֹרֵ֣עַ מוּסָ֑ר וְשֹׁמֵ֖ר תּוֹכַ֣חַת יְכֻבָּֽד׃	Poverty and shame shall be to him that refuseth instruction; But he that regardeth reproof shall be honoured.
19	תַּאֲוָ֣ה נִ֭הְיָה תֶּעֱרַ֣ב לְנָ֑פֶשׁ וְתוֹעֲבַ֥ת כְּ֝סִילִ֗ים ס֣וּר מֵרָֽע׃	The desire accomplished is sweet to the soul; And it is an abomination to fools to depart from evil.
20	(הלוך) [הוֹלֵ֣ךְ] אֶת־חֲכָמִ֣ים (וחכם) [יֶחְכָּ֑ם] וְרֹעֶ֖ה כְסִילִ֣ים יֵרֽוֹעַ׃	He that walketh with wise men shall be wise; But the companion of fools shall smart for it.
21	חַ֭טָּאִים תְּרַדֵּ֣ף רָעָ֑ה וְאֶת־צַ֝דִּיקִ֗ים יְשַׁלֶּם־טֽוֹב׃	Evil pursueth sinners; But to the righteous good shall be repaid.
22	ט֗וֹב יַנְחִ֥יל בְּנֵֽי־בָנִ֑ים וְצָפ֥וּן לַ֝צַּדִּ֗יק חֵ֣יל חוֹטֵֽא׃	A good man leaveth an inheritance to his children's children; And the wealth of the sinner is laid up for the righteous.
23	רׇב־אֹ֭כֶל נִ֣יר רָאשִׁ֑ים וְיֵ֥שׁ נִ֝סְפֶּ֗ה בְּלֹ֣א מִשְׁפָּֽט׃	Much food is in the tillage of the poor; But there is that is swept away by want of righteousness.
24	חוֹשֵׂ֣ךְ שִׁ֭בְטוֹ שׂוֹנֵ֣א בְנ֑וֹ וְ֝אֹהֲב֗וֹ שִׁחֲר֥וֹ מוּסָֽר׃	He that spareth his rod hateth his son; But he that loveth him chasteneth him betimes.
25	צַדִּ֗יק אֹ֭כֵֽל לְשֹׂ֣בַע נַפְשׁ֑וֹ וּבֶ֖טֶן רְשָׁעִ֣ים תֶּחְסָֽר׃	The righteous eateth to the satisfying of his desire; But the belly of the wicked shall want.

=== Textual witnesses ===
Some early manuscripts containing the text of this chapter in Hebrew are of the Masoretic Text, which includes the Aleppo Codex (10th century), and Codex Leningradensis (1008). Fragments containing parts of this chapter in Hebrew were found among the Dead Sea Scrolls including 4Q103 (4QProv^{b}; 30 BCE – 30 CE) with extant verses 6–9.

There is also a translation into Koine Greek known as the Septuagint, made in the last few centuries BC. Extant ancient manuscripts of the Septuagint version include Codex Vaticanus (B; $\mathfrak{G}$^{B}; 4th century), Codex Sinaiticus (S; BHK: $\mathfrak{G}$^{S}; 4th century), and Codex Alexandrinus (A; $\mathfrak{G}$^{A}; 5th century).

== Analysis ==
This chapter belongs to a section regarded as the second collection in the book of Proverbs (comprising Proverbs 10:1–22:16), also called "The First 'Solomonic' Collection" (the second one in Proverbs 25:1–29:27). The collection contains 375 sayings, each of which consists of two parallel phrases, except for Proverbs 19:7 which consists of three parts.

== Verse 1 ==
A wise son hears his father's instruction, but a scoffer does not listen to rebuke.

— Proverbs 13:1, English Standard Version

- "Hears [...] instruction": from the Hebrew word מוסר, which the Masoretic Text reads as the noun מוּסָר, musar, 'discipline', hence depriving the first clause of a verb, but G. R. Driver suggested that the same word (which originally does not contain vocalization) be read as מְיֻסַּר, meyussar, 'allows himself to be disciplined'. A few Medieval Hebrew manuscripts, read יִשְׁמַע, yishmaʿ, to render the clause "a wise son listens to/obeys his father", which is supported by the Greek Septuagint, and the Syriac versions.

This saying reinforces the parental appeals of chapters 1–9, with a warning that a refusal to heed correction ("rebuke") would place 'wisdom beyond reach' of the 'scoffer' (cf. Proverbs 9:7–8; 14:6; 15:12). verse 24 uses the word 'discipline' (Hebrew: mū-sār) in relation to physical chastisement.

== Verse 24 ==
He who spares his rod hates his son, but he who loves him disciplines him early.

— Proverbs 13:24, Modern English Version

- "Rod": from שֵׁבֶט, shebet, also meaning 'staff, club, scepter, tribe', here in the sense of "correction" which a child's fault requires.
- "Hates": from שָׂנֵא, saneʾ, in essence "abandon" or "reject" a child for failing to discipline—not caring about the child's character.

The word 'discipline' here is used in relation to 'physical chastisement' (cf. "instruction" in verse 1), which is viewed as essential for the upbringing of a child. The contrast between 'hate' and 'love' points to the importance of the wisdom attached to it (cf. Proverbs 20:30; 23:13–14).

== See also ==
- Child discipline
- Fear of God
- Mitzvah
- Parenting
- Sin
- Proverbs 9
- Proverbs 20
- Proverbs 23

== Sources ==
- Aitken, K. T. (2007). "19. Proverbs". In Barton, John; Muddiman, John (eds.). The Oxford Bible Commentary (first (paperback) ed.). Oxford University Press. pp. 405–422. ISBN 978-0199277186.
- Alter, Robert (2010). The Wisdom Books: Job, Proverbs, and Ecclesiastes: A Translation with Commentary. W.W. Norton & Co. ISBN 978-0393080735.
- Coogan, Michael David (2007). Coogan, Michael David; Brettler, Marc Zvi; Newsom, Carol Ann; Perkins, Pheme (eds.). The New Oxford Annotated Bible with the Apocryphal/Deuterocanonical Books: New Revised Standard Version, Issue 48 (Augmented 3rd ed.). Oxford University Press. ISBN 9780195288810.
- Farmer, Kathleen A. (1998). "The Wisdom Books". In McKenzie, Steven L.; Graham, Matt Patrick (eds.). The Hebrew Bible Today: An Introduction to Critical Issues. Westminster John Knox Press. ISBN 978-0-66425652-4.
- Fitzmyer, Joseph A. (2008). A Guide to the Dead Sea Scrolls and Related Literature. Grand Rapids, MI: William B. Eerdmans Publishing Company. ISBN 9780802862419.
- Fox, Michael V. (2009). Proverbs 10-31: A New Translation with Introduction and Commentary. Anchor Yale Bible Commentaries. Yale University Press. ISBN 978-0300155563.
- Halley, Henry H. (1965). Halley's Bible Handbook: an abbreviated Bible commentary (24th (revised) ed.). Zondervan Publishing House. ISBN 0-310-25720-4.
- Perdue, Leo G. (2012). Proverbs Interpretation: A Bible Commentary for Teaching and Preaching. Presbyterian Publishing Corporation. ISBN 978-0664238841.
- Ulrich, Eugene, ed. (2010). The Biblical Qumran Scrolls: Transcriptions and Textual Variants. Brill.
- Würthwein, Ernst (1995). The Text of the Old Testament. Translated by Rhodes, Erroll F. Grand Rapids, MI: Wm. B. Eerdmans. ISBN 0-8028-0788-7.
