= Proverbs 12 =

Twelfth chapter of the biblical book of Proverbs

- ← chapter 11 chapter 13 →
- The whole Book of Proverbs in the Leningrad Codex (1008 C.E.) from an old facsimile edition.
- Book: Book of Proverbs
- Category: Ketuvim
- Christian Bible part: Old Testament
- Order in the Christian part: 21

Proverbs 12 is the twelfth chapter of the Book of Proverbs in the Hebrew Bible or the Old Testament of the Christian Bible. The book is a compilation of several wisdom literature collections, with the heading in 1:1 may be intended to regard Solomon as the traditional author of the whole book, but the dates of the individual collections are difficult to determine, and the book probably obtained its final shape in the post-exilic period. This chapter is a part of the second collection of the book.

== Text ==
=== Hebrew ===
The following table shows the Hebrew text of Proverbs 12 with vowels alongside an English translation based upon the JPS 1917 translation (now in the public domain).

Verse	Hebrew	English translation (JPS 1917)
1	אֹהֵ֣ב מ֭וּסָר אֹ֣הֵֽב דָּ֑עַת וְשׂוֹנֵ֖א תוֹכַ֣חַת בָּֽעַר׃	Whoso loveth knowledge loveth correction; But he that is brutish hateth reproof.
2	ט֗וֹב יָפִ֣יק רָ֭צוֹן מֵיְהֹוָ֑ה וְאִ֖ישׁ מְזִמּ֣וֹת יַרְשִֽׁיעַ׃	A good man shall obtain favour of the LORD; But a man of wicked devices will He condemn.
3	לֹא־יִכּ֣וֹן אָדָ֣ם בְּרֶ֑שַׁע וְשֹׁ֥רֶשׁ צַ֝דִּיקִ֗ים בַּל־יִמּֽוֹט׃	A man shall not be established by wickedness; But the root of the righteous shall never be moved.
4	אֵֽשֶׁת־חַ֭יִל עֲטֶ֣רֶת בַּעְלָ֑הּ וּכְרָקָ֖ב בְּעַצְמוֹתָ֣יו מְבִישָֽׁה׃	A virtuous woman is a crown to her husband; But she that doeth shamefully is as rottenness in his bones.
5	מַחְשְׁב֣וֹת צַדִּיקִ֣ים מִשְׁפָּ֑ט תַּחְבֻּל֖וֹת רְשָׁעִ֣ים מִרְמָֽה׃	The thoughts of the righteous are right; But the counsels of the wicked are deceit.
6	דִּבְרֵ֣י רְשָׁעִ֣ים אֱרׇב־דָּ֑ם וּפִ֥י יְ֝שָׁרִ֗ים יַצִּילֵֽם׃	The words of the wicked are to lie in wait for blood; But the mouth of the upright shall deliver them.
7	הָפ֣וֹךְ רְשָׁעִ֣ים וְאֵינָ֑ם וּבֵ֖ית צַדִּיקִ֣ים יַעֲמֹֽד׃	The wicked are overthrown, and are not; But the house of the righteous shall stand.
8	לְֽפִי־שִׂ֭כְלוֹ יְהֻלַּל־אִ֑ישׁ וְנַעֲוֵה־לֵ֝֗ב יִהְיֶ֥ה לָבֽוּז׃	A man shall be commended according to his intelligence; But he that is of a distorted understanding shall be despised.
9	ט֣וֹב נִ֭קְלֶה וְעֶ֣בֶד ל֑וֹ מִ֝מִּתְכַּבֵּ֗ד וַחֲסַר־לָֽחֶם׃	Better is he that is lightly esteemed, and hath a servant, Than he that playeth the man of rank, and lacketh bread.
10	יוֹדֵ֣עַ צַ֭דִּיק נֶ֣פֶשׁ בְּהֶמְתּ֑וֹ וְֽרַחֲמֵ֥י רְ֝שָׁעִ֗ים אַכְזָרִֽי׃	A righteous man regardeth the life of his beast; But the tender mercies of the wicked are cruel.
11	עֹבֵ֣ד אַ֭דְמָתוֹ יִֽשְׂבַּֽע־לָ֑חֶם וּמְרַדֵּ֖ף רֵיקִ֣ים חֲסַר־לֵֽב׃	He that tilleth his ground shall have plenty of bread; But he that followeth after vain things is void of understanding.
12	חָמַ֣ד רָ֭שָׁע מְצ֣וֹד רָעִ֑ים וְשֹׁ֖רֶשׁ צַדִּיקִ֣ים יִתֵּֽן׃	The wicked desireth the prey of evil men; But the root of the righteous yieldeth fruit.
13	בְּפֶ֣שַׁע שְׂ֭פָתַיִם מוֹקֵ֣שׁ רָ֑ע וַיֵּצֵ֖א מִצָּרָ֣ה צַדִּֽיק׃	In the transgression of the lips is a snare to the evil man; But the righteous cometh out of trouble.
14	מִפְּרִ֣י פִי־אִ֭ישׁ יִשְׂבַּע־ט֑וֹב וּגְמ֥וּל יְדֵי־אָ֝דָ֗ם (ישוב) [יָשִׁ֥יב] לֽוֹ׃	A man shall be satisfied with good by the fruit of his mouth; And the doings of a man's hands shall be rendered unto him.
15	דֶּ֣רֶךְ אֱ֭וִיל יָשָׁ֣ר בְּעֵינָ֑יו וְשֹׁמֵ֖עַ לְעֵצָ֣ה חָכָֽם׃	The way of a fool is straight in his own eyes; But he that is wise hearkeneth unto counsel.
16	אֱוִ֗יל בַּ֭יּוֹם יִוָּדַ֣ע כַּעְס֑וֹ וְכֹסֶ֖ה קָל֣וֹן עָרֽוּם׃	A fool's vexation is presently known; But a prudent man concealeth shame.
17	יָפִ֣יחַ אֱ֭מוּנָה יַגִּ֣יד צֶ֑דֶק וְעֵ֖ד שְׁקָרִ֣ים מִרְמָֽה׃	He that breatheth forth truth uttereth righteousness; But a false witness deceit.
18	יֵ֣שׁ בּ֭וֹטֶה כְּמַדְקְר֣וֹת חָ֑רֶב וּלְשׁ֖וֹן חֲכָמִ֣ים מַרְפֵּֽא׃	There is that speaketh like the piercings of a sword; But the tongue of the wise is health.
19	שְֽׂפַת־אֱ֭מֶת תִּכּ֣וֹן לָעַ֑ד וְעַד־אַ֝רְגִּ֗יעָה לְשׁ֣וֹן שָֽׁקֶר׃	The lip of truth shall be established for ever; But a lying tongue is but for a moment.
20	מִ֭רְמָה בְּלֶב־חֹ֣רְשֵׁי רָ֑ע וּֽלְיֹעֲצֵ֖י שָׁל֣וֹם שִׂמְחָֽה׃	Deceit is in the heart of them that devise evil; But to the counsellors of peace is joy.
21	לֹא־יְאֻנֶּ֣ה לַצַּדִּ֣יק כׇּל־אָ֑וֶן וּ֝רְשָׁעִ֗ים מָ֣לְאוּ רָֽע׃	There shall no mischief befall the righteous; But the wicked are filled with evil.
22	תּוֹעֲבַ֣ת יְ֭הֹוָה שִׂפְתֵי־שָׁ֑קֶר וְעֹשֵׂ֖י אֱמוּנָ֣ה רְצוֹנֽוֹ׃	Lying lips are an abomination to the LORD; But they that deal truly are His delight. .
23	אָדָ֣ם עָ֭רוּם כֹּ֣סֶה דָּ֑עַת וְלֵ֥ב כְּ֝סִילִ֗ים יִקְרָ֥א אִוֶּֽלֶת׃	A prudent man concealeth knowledge; But the heart of fools proclaimeth foolishness.
24	יַד־חָרוּצִ֥ים תִּמְשׁ֑וֹל וּ֝רְמִיָּ֗ה תִּהְיֶ֥ה לָמַֽס׃	The hand of the diligent shall bear rule; But the slothful shall be under tribute.
25	דְּאָגָ֣ה בְלֶב־אִ֣ישׁ יַשְׁחֶ֑נָּה וְדָבָ֖ר ט֣וֹב יְשַׂמְּחֶֽנָּה׃	Care in the heart of a man boweth it down; But a good word maketh it glad.
26	יָתֵ֣ר מֵרֵעֵ֣הוּ צַדִּ֑יק וְדֶ֖רֶךְ רְשָׁעִ֣ים תַּתְעֵֽם׃	The righteous is guided by his friend; But the way of the wicked leadeth them astray.
27	לֹא־יַחֲרֹ֣ךְ רְמִיָּ֣ה צֵיד֑וֹ וְהוֹן־אָדָ֖ם יָקָ֣ר חָרֽוּץ׃	The slothful man shall not hunt his prey; But the precious substance of men is to be diligent.
28	בְּאֹֽרַח־צְדָקָ֥ה חַיִּ֑ים וְדֶ֖רֶךְ נְתִיבָ֣הֿ אַל־מָֽוֶת׃	In the way of righteousness is life; And in the pathway thereof there is no death.

=== Textual witnesses ===
Some early manuscripts containing the text of this chapter in Hebrew are of the Masoretic Text, which includes the Aleppo Codex (10th century), and Codex Leningradensis (1008).

There is also a translation into Koine Greek known as the Septuagint, made in the last few centuries BC. Extant ancient manuscripts of the Septuagint version include Codex Vaticanus (B; $\mathfrak{G}$^{B}; 4th century), Codex Sinaiticus (S; BHK: $\mathfrak{G}$^{S}; 4th century), and Codex Alexandrinus (A; $\mathfrak{G}$^{A}; 5th century).

== Analysis ==
This chapter belongs to a section regarded as the second collection in the book of Proverbs (comprising Proverbs 10:1–22:16), also called "The First 'Solomonic' Collection" (the second one in Proverbs 25:1–29:27). The collection contains 375 sayings, each of which consists of two parallel phrases, except for Proverbs 19:7 which consists of three parts.

== Verse 1 ==
Whoever loves discipline loves knowledge,

but he who hates reproof is stupid

- "Stupid”: from the Hebrew word בַּעַר, baʿar, “stupid, brutish”, which comes from בְּעִיר, beʿir, "beast, cattle";referring to a 'lack of rationality' (Psalm 30:2; 49:10; 73:22; 92:7).

This saying along with those in verses 15–16 and 23 describe central characteristics of a "fool" in the Book of Proverbs, mainly:

- imperviousness to a word of advice as to a word of rebuke, by reason of one's innate stupidity and self-conceit, (verses 1, 15; cf. 18:2; 28:26).
- inability to recognize sound advice and to act upon it—not least by those used to giving it (verse 26).
- lacks self-control, both of one's temper (verse 16; cf. 14:17, 29; 29:11) and one's tongue (verse 23; cf. 10:14; 15:2; 18:6-7).
- eagerness to speak one's mind and offers opinions (cf. 18:2) that advertises one's folly, in contrast to the disciplined, restrained speech of the wise ('conceals knowledge') (cf. 10:19; 17:28).

== Verse 28 ==
In the path of righteousness is life,

and in its pathway there is no death.

- "Pathway": from דֶרֶך נְתִיבָה, derekh netivah, “a way, a path”, with a duplication of meaning. Repointing the first word as a Qal participle (דֹּרֵך, dorekh) would give a meaning “treading a path [that leads to…].”
- "No death": following the Masoretic vocalization of the consonants אל־מות, ʾl mvt, as אַל־מָוֶת, ʾal mavet, which can give a sense of "immortality" (“the journey of [her] path is no-death”). Many medieval Hebrew manuscripts and all the versions vocalize it as אֶל־מָוֶת, ʾel mavet, meaning “leads to death” (cf. NAB, NCV). The Greek Septuagint version reads the whole second clause as “the ways of the revengeful [lead] to death”.

== See also ==
- Charity
- Creator deity
- Divine providence
- Evil
- Fear of God
- Mitzvah
- Nephesh
- Omniscience
- Relativism
- Sin
- Soul in the Bible
- YHWH
- Related Bible parts: Psalm 30, Psalm 49, Proverbs 9, Proverbs 20, Proverbs 23

== Sources ==
- Aitken, K. T. (2007). "19. Proverbs". In Barton, John; Muddiman, John (eds.). The Oxford Bible Commentary (first (paperback) ed.). Oxford University Press. pp. 405–422. ISBN 978-0199277186.
- Alter, Robert (2010). The Wisdom Books: Job, Proverbs, and Ecclesiastes: A Translation with Commentary. W.W. Norton & Co. ISBN 978-0393080735.
- Coogan, Michael David (2007). Coogan, Michael David; Brettler, Marc Zvi; Newsom, Carol Ann; Perkins, Pheme (eds.). The New Oxford Annotated Bible with the Apocryphal/Deuterocanonical Books: New Revised Standard Version, Issue 48 (Augmented 3rd ed.). Oxford University Press. ISBN 9780195288810.
- Farmer, Kathleen A. (1998). "The Wisdom Books". In McKenzie, Steven L.; Graham, Matt Patrick (eds.). The Hebrew Bible Today: An Introduction to Critical Issues. Westminster John Knox Press. ISBN 978-0-66425652-4.
- Fox, Michael V. (2009). Proverbs 10-31: A New Translation with Introduction and Commentary. Anchor Yale Bible Commentaries. Yale University Press. ISBN 978-0300155563.
- Halley, Henry H. (1965). Halley's Bible Handbook: an abbreviated Bible commentary (24th (revised) ed.). Zondervan Publishing House. ISBN 0-310-25720-4.
- Perdue, Leo G. (2012). Proverbs Interpretation: A Bible Commentary for Teaching and Preaching. Presbyterian Publishing Corporation. ISBN 978-0664238841.
- Würthwein, Ernst (1995). The Text of the Old Testament. Translated by Rhodes, Erroll F. Grand Rapids, MI: Wm. B. Eerdmans. ISBN 0-8028-0788-7.
