= Proverbs 16 =

Sixteenth chapter of the biblical book of Proverbs

- ← chapter 15 chapter 17 →
- The whole Book of Proverbs in the Leningrad Codex (1008 C.E.) from an old facsimile edition.
- Book: Book of Proverbs
- Category: Ketuvim
- Christian Bible part: Old Testament
- Order in the Christian part: 21

Proverbs 16 is the sixteenth chapter of the Book of Proverbs in the Hebrew Bible or the Old Testament of the Christian Bible. The book is a compilation of several wisdom literature collections, with the heading in 1:1 may be intended to regard Solomon as the traditional author of the whole book, but the dates of the individual collections are difficult to determine, and the book probably obtained its final shape in the post-exilic period. This chapter is a part of the second collection of the book.

== Text ==
=== Hebrew ===
The following table shows the Hebrew text of Proverbs 16 with vowels alongside an English translation based upon the JPS 1917 translation (now in the public domain).

Verse	Hebrew	English translation (JPS 1917)
1	לְאָדָ֥ם מַעַרְכֵי־לֵ֑ב וּ֝מֵיְהֹוָ֗ה מַעֲנֵ֥ה לָשֽׁוֹן׃	The preparations of the heart are man's, But the answer of the tongue is from the LORD.
2	כׇּֽל־דַּרְכֵי־אִ֭ישׁ זַ֣ךְ בְּעֵינָ֑יו וְתֹכֵ֖ן רוּח֣וֹת יְהֹוָֽה׃	All the ways of a man are clean in his own eyes; But the LORD weigheth the spirits.
3	גֹּ֣ל אֶל־יְהֹוָ֣ה מַעֲשֶׂ֑יךָ וְ֝יִכֹּ֗נוּ מַחְשְׁבֹתֶֽיךָ׃	Commit thy works unto the LORD, And thy thoughts shall be established.
4	כֹּ֤ל פָּעַ֣ל יְ֭הֹוָה לַֽמַּעֲנֵ֑הוּ וְגַם־רָ֝שָׁ֗ע לְי֣וֹם רָעָֽה׃	The LORD hath made every things for His own purpose, Yea, even the wicked for the day of evil.
5	תּוֹעֲבַ֣ת יְ֭הֹוָה כׇּל־גְּבַהּ־לֵ֑ב יָ֥ד לְ֝יָ֗ד לֹ֣א יִנָּקֶֽה׃	Every one that is proud in heart is an abomination to the LORD; My hand upon it! he shall not be unpunished.
6	בְּחֶ֣סֶד וֶ֭אֱמֶת יְכֻפַּ֣ר עָוֺ֑ן וּבְיִרְאַ֥ת יְ֝הֹוָ֗ה ס֣וּר מֵרָֽע׃	By mercy and truth iniquity is expiated; And by the fear of the LORD men depart from evil.
7	בִּרְצ֣וֹת יְ֭הֹוָה דַּרְכֵי־אִ֑ישׁ גַּם־א֝וֹיְבָ֗יו יַשְׁלִ֥ם אִתּֽוֹ׃	When a man's ways please the LORD, He maketh even his enemies to be at peace with him.
8	טוֹב־מְ֭עַט בִּצְדָקָ֑ה מֵרֹ֥ב תְּ֝בוּא֗וֹת בְּלֹ֣א מִשְׁפָּֽט׃	Better is a little with righteousness Than great revenues with injustice.
9	לֵ֣ב אָ֭דָם יְחַשֵּׁ֣ב דַּרְכּ֑וֹ וַ֝יהֹוָ֗ה יָכִ֥ין צַעֲדֽוֹ׃	A man's heart deviseth his way; But the LORD directeth his steps.
10	קֶ֤סֶם ׀ עַֽל־שִׂפְתֵי־מֶ֑לֶךְ בְּ֝מִשְׁפָּ֗ט לֹ֣א יִמְעַל־פִּֽיו׃	A divine sentence is in the lips of the king; His mouth trespasseth not in judgment.
11	פֶּ֤לֶס ׀ וּמֹאזְנֵ֣י מִ֭שְׁפָּט לַיהֹוָ֑ה מַ֝עֲשֵׂ֗הוּ כׇּל־אַבְנֵי־כִֽיס׃	A just balance and scales are the LORD’S; All the weights of the bag are His work.
12	תּוֹעֲבַ֣ת מְ֭לָכִים עֲשׂ֣וֹת רֶ֑שַׁע כִּ֥י בִ֝צְדָקָ֗ה יִכּ֥וֹן כִּסֵּֽא׃	It is an abomination to kings to commit wickedness; For the throne is established by righteousness.
13	רְצ֣וֹן מְ֭לָכִים שִׂפְתֵי־צֶ֑דֶק וְדֹבֵ֖ר יְשָׁרִ֣ים יֶאֱהָֽב׃	Righteous lips are the delight of kings; And they love him that speaketh right.
14	חֲמַת־מֶ֥לֶךְ מַלְאֲכֵי־מָ֑וֶת וְאִ֖ישׁ חָכָ֣ם יְכַפְּרֶֽנָּה׃	The wrath of a king is as messengers of death; But a wise man will pacify it.
15	בְּאוֹר־פְּנֵי־מֶ֥לֶךְ חַיִּ֑ים וּ֝רְצוֹנ֗וֹ כְּעָ֣ב מַלְקֽוֹשׁ׃	In the light of the king's countenance is life; And his favour is as a cloud of the latter rain.
16	קְֽנֹה־חׇכְמָ֗ה מַה־טּ֥וֹב מֵחָר֑וּץ וּקְנ֥וֹת בִּ֝ינָ֗ה נִבְחָ֥ר מִכָּֽסֶף׃	How much better is it to get wisdom than gold! Yea, to get understanding is rather to be chosen than silver.
17	מְסִלַּ֣ת יְ֭שָׁרִים ס֣וּר מֵרָ֑ע שֹׁמֵ֥ר נַ֝פְשׁ֗וֹ נֹצֵ֥ר דַּרְכּֽוֹ׃	The highway of the upright is to depart from evil; He that keepeth his way preserveth his soul.
18	לִפְנֵי־שֶׁ֥בֶר גָּא֑וֹן וְלִפְנֵ֥י כִ֝שָּׁל֗וֹן גֹּ֣בַהּ רֽוּחַ׃	Pride goeth before destruction, And a haughty spirit before a fall.
19	ט֣וֹב שְׁפַל־ר֭וּחַ אֶת־[עֲנָוִ֑ים] (עניים) מֵחַלֵּ֥ק שָׁ֝לָ֗ל אֶת־גֵּאִֽים׃	Better it is to be of a lowly spirit with the humble, Than to divide the spoil with the proud.
20	מַשְׂכִּ֣יל עַל־דָּ֭בָר יִמְצָא־ט֑וֹב וּבוֹטֵ֖חַ בַּיהֹוָ֣ה אַשְׁרָֽיו׃	He that giveth heed unto the word shall find good; And whoso trusteth in the LORD, happy is he.
21	לַֽחֲכַם־לֵ֭ב יִקָּרֵ֣א נָב֑וֹן וּמֶ֥תֶק שְׂ֝פָתַ֗יִם יֹסִ֥יף לֶֽקַח׃	The wise in heart is called a man of discernment; And the sweetness of the lips increaseth learning.
22	מְק֣וֹר חַ֭יִּים שֵׂ֣כֶל בְּעָלָ֑יו וּמוּסַ֖ר אֱוִלִ֣ים אִוֶּֽלֶת׃	Understanding is a fountain of life unto him that hath it; But folly is the chastisement of fools.
23	לֵ֣ב חָ֭כָם יַשְׂכִּ֣יל פִּ֑יהוּ וְעַל־שְׂ֝פָתָ֗יו יֹסִ֥יף לֶֽקַח׃	The heart of the wise teacheth his mouth, And addeth learning to his lips.
24	צוּף־דְּ֭בַשׁ אִמְרֵי־נֹ֑עַם מָת֥וֹק לַ֝נֶּ֗פֶשׁ וּמַרְפֵּ֥א לָעָֽצֶם׃	Pleasant words are as a honeycomb, Sweet to the soul, and health to the bones.
25	יֵ֤שׁ דֶּ֣רֶךְ יָ֭שָׁר לִפְנֵי־אִ֑ישׁ וְ֝אַחֲרִיתָ֗הּ דַּרְכֵי־מָֽוֶת׃	There is a way which seemeth right unto a man, But the end thereof are the ways of death.
26	נֶ֣פֶשׁ עָ֭מֵל עָ֣מְלָה לּ֑וֹ כִּֽי־אָכַ֖ף עָלָ֣יו פִּֽיהוּ׃	The hunger of the labouring man laboureth for him; For his mouth compelleth him.
27	אִ֣ישׁ בְּ֭לִיַּעַל כֹּרֶ֣ה רָעָ֑ה וְעַל־[שְׂ֝פָת֗וֹ] (שפתיו) כְּאֵ֣שׁ צָרָֽבֶת	An ungodly man diggeth up evil, And in his lips there is as a burning fire.
28	אִ֣ישׁ תַּ֭הְפֻּכוֹת יְשַׁלַּ֣ח מָד֑וֹן וְ֝נִרְגָּ֗ן מַפְרִ֥יד אַלּֽוּף׃	A froward man soweth strife; And a whisperer separateth familiar friends.
29	אִ֣ישׁ חָ֭מָס יְפַתֶּ֣ה רֵעֵ֑הוּ וְ֝הוֹלִיכ֗וֹ בְּדֶ֣רֶךְ לֹא־טֽוֹב׃	A man of violence enticeth his neighbour, And leadeth him into a way that is not good.
30	עֹצֶ֣ה עֵ֭ינָיו לַחְשֹׁ֣ב תַּהְפֻּכ֑וֹת קֹרֵ֥ץ שְׂ֝פָתָ֗יו כִּלָּ֥ה רָעָֽה׃	He shutteth his eyes, it is to devise froward things; He that biteth his lips bringeth evil to pass.
31	עֲטֶ֣רֶת תִּפְאֶ֣רֶת שֵׂיבָ֑ה בְּדֶ֥רֶךְ צְ֝דָקָ֗ה תִּמָּצֵֽא׃	The hoary head is a crown of glory, It is found in the way of righteousness.
32	ט֤וֹב אֶ֣רֶךְ אַ֭פַּיִם מִגִּבּ֑וֹר וּמֹשֵׁ֥ל בְּ֝רוּח֗וֹ מִלֹּכֵ֥ד עִֽיר׃	He that is slow to anger is better than the mighty; And he that ruleth his spirit than he that taketh a city.
33	בַּ֭חֵיק יוּטַ֣ל אֶת־הַגּוֹרָ֑ל וּ֝מֵיְהֹוָ֗ה כׇּל־מִשְׁפָּטֽוֹ׃	The lot is cast into the lap; But the whole disposing thereof is of the LORD.

=== Textual witnesses ===
Some early manuscripts containing the text of this chapter in Hebrew are of the Masoretic Text, which includes the Aleppo Codex (10th century), and Codex Leningradensis (1008).

There is also a translation into Koine Greek known as the Septuagint, made in the last few centuries BC. Extant ancient manuscripts of the Septuagint version include Codex Vaticanus (B; $\mathfrak{G}$^{B}; 4th century), Codex Sinaiticus (S; BHK: $\mathfrak{G}$^{S}; 4th century), and Codex Alexandrinus (A; $\mathfrak{G}$^{A}; 5th century).

== Analysis ==
This chapter belongs to a section regarded as the second collection in the book of Proverbs (comprising Proverbs 10:1–22:16), also called "The First 'Solomonic' Collection" (the second one in Proverbs 25:1–29:27). The collection contains 375 sayings, each of which consists of two parallel phrases, except for Proverbs 19:7 which consists of three parts.

== Verse 1 ==
The plans of the heart belong to man,

but the answer of the tongue is from the Lord.

- "The plans of the heart”: from Hebrew: מַעַרְכֵי־לֵב, maʿarekhe lev, can be rendered as “the arrangements of the mind.”

The saying in this verse states that a person may set things in order, plan out what one is going to say, but God can sovereignly enable to put one's thoughts into words. Together with verses 2–7 and 9, it form a small cluster of sayings dealing with divine providence over human affairs, contrasting sayings which commend 'careful planning as the key to successful undertakings' (cf. Proverbs 15:22; 20:18; 21:5), with the limitations that 'only plans coinciding with God's purposes will succeed' (verse 3; cf. Proverbs 19:21), thus 'man proposes, but God disposes' (verses 1, 9, cf. verse 33).

== Verse 9 ==
A man’s heart plans his way,

But the Lord directs his steps.

- "Heart": from the Hebrew word לֵב, lev, which can also mean “mind” representsing the faculty within a person most relevant to the verb for 'planning'.

This saying emphasizes the theme of 'man proposes, but God disposes' along with verses 1 and 33.

== Verse 33 ==
The lot is cast into the lap,

but the whole outcome is of the Lord.

This saying concerns the practice of seeking divine leading through casting lots (cf. 1 Samuel 10:20–21), for examples, in the settlement of legal disputes (cf. 18:18), that 'however much a matter of chance the procedure may appear', God is 'the one who makes the decision' (literally, "judgement"), following the theme of 'man proposes, but God disposes' in verses 1 and 9.

== Uses ==
- Verse 25 is quoted in the chapter 26 of Didascalia Apostolorum, an ancient Christian teaching book from 230 AD.

== See also ==
- Alcohol in the Bible
- Charity
- Creator deity
- Divine providence
- Evil
- Fear of God
- Mitzvah
- Nephesh
- Omniscience
- Relativism
- Sin
- Soul in the Bible
- YHWH
- Related Bible parts: Deuteronomy 12, Proverbs 7, Proverbs 15, Proverbs 22, Isaiah 34, Ezekiel 39

== Sources ==
- Aitken, K. T. (2007). "19. Proverbs". In Barton, John; Muddiman, John (eds.). The Oxford Bible Commentary (first (paperback) ed.). Oxford University Press. pp. 405–422. ISBN 978-0199277186.
- Alter, Robert (2010). The Wisdom Books: Job, Proverbs, and Ecclesiastes: A Translation with Commentary. W.W. Norton & Co. ISBN 978-0393080735.
- Coogan, Michael David (2007). Coogan, Michael David; Brettler, Marc Zvi; Newsom, Carol Ann; Perkins, Pheme (eds.). The New Oxford Annotated Bible with the Apocryphal/Deuterocanonical Books: New Revised Standard Version, Issue 48 (Augmented 3rd ed.). Oxford University Press. ISBN 9780195288810.
- Farmer, Kathleen A. (1998). "The Wisdom Books". In McKenzie, Steven L.; Graham, Matt Patrick (eds.). The Hebrew Bible Today: An Introduction to Critical Issues. Westminster John Knox Press. ISBN 978-0-66425652-4.
- Fox, Michael V. (2009). Proverbs 10-31: A New Translation with Introduction and Commentary. Anchor Yale Bible Commentaries. Yale University Press. ISBN 978-0300155563.
- Halley, Henry H. (1965). Halley's Bible Handbook: an abbreviated Bible commentary (24th (revised) ed.). Zondervan Publishing House. ISBN 0-310-25720-4.
- Perdue, Leo G. (2012). Proverbs Interpretation: A Bible Commentary for Teaching and Preaching. Presbyterian Publishing Corporation. ISBN 978-0664238841.
- Würthwein, Ernst (1995). The Text of the Old Testament. Translated by Rhodes, Erroll F. Grand Rapids, MI: Wm. B. Eerdmans. ISBN 0-8028-0788-7.
