= The Heart Knows Its Own Bitterness =

Talmudic passage and ethical principle

"The Heart Knows Its Own Bitterness" (Hebrew: לֵב יוֹדֵעַ מָרַּת נַפְשׁוֹ) is a sugya (passage) in the Babylonian Talmud's tractate Yoma, which discusses when a person may be exempt from fasting on Yom Kippur, the Day of Atonement. The sugya hinges on the interpretation of a Biblical verse. A phrase from this verse – "The Heart Knows its Own Bitterness" (Proverbs 14:10) – serves as the name of both the sugya and a principle in Jewish law and ethics that is derived from the sugya.

The sugya analyzes a few statements from the Mishnah, a rabbinic work that is the core of the Babylonian Talmud. There are related texts in the Tosefta and Jerusalem Talmud. For centuries, the sugya has been relevant to deliberations over real or perceived health risks, especially when facing religious obligations such as fasting on Yom Kippur. In contemporary Jewish medical ethics, the passage is used to assess patient autonomy in relation to expert medical opinion. In a more expansive move, progressive (non-Orthodox) Jews have invoked this principle and its sugya to adjust rabbinic law for gay, transgender, and disabled Jewish lives.

== Textual development ==
The sugya of "The Heart Knows its Own Bitterness" is found at Yoma 83a of the Babylonian Talmud (circa 600 CE). Yoma deals with the Jewish day of atonement, Yom Kippur, and it is a tractate within the Talmud, a foundational work for Jewish ethics and rabbinic law. In its deliberations, the Talmud typically draws upon earlier texts, such as the Mishnah (circa 210 CE), Tosefta, and the Hebrew Bible.

=== Mishnah and Tosefta ===
In this sugya, the Talmud discusses the meaning and implications of a few sentences from the Mishnah, Yoma mishnah 8:5, which allows for exemptions from Yom Kippur fasting due to pregnancy or illness. The mishnah states: (Note: Translation source: The William Davidson digital edition of the Koren Noé Talmud, with commentary by Rabbi Adin Even-Israel SteinsaltzRead More Source: korenpub.com Digitization: Sefaria.com License: CC-BY-NC)

If a person is ill and requires food due to potential danger, one feeds him according to the advice of medical experts who determine that he indeed requires food. And if there are no experts there, one feeds him according to his own instructions, until he says that he has eaten enough and needs no more.

In its plain meaning, this mishnah says when a sick person may eat during the fast of Yom Kippur.

There is a stricter policy toward fast in a parallel passage in the Tosefta (Yoma 4:2), from the same time period. This Tosefta passage also includes stories of Shammai and Rabbi Akiva, which are not found in the mishnah. Tracing the history of this sugya, Law Professor Ayelet Hoffmann Libson states that these stories show that exemptions to fasting "were used sparingly." Libson points out that "according to this passage it is not at all evident that the value of human life overrides all other considerations," such as the priority to fast on Yom Kippur. Moreover, Libson puts the mishnah's approach in the context of "veneration of expertise," given that the rabbis were themselves authorities who relied on their expertise over Jewish law.

=== Babylonian Talmud ===
In the Talmudic sugya, the Gemara passage quotes from the mishnah above (Yoma 8:5) and then brings a statement about Yom Kippur fasting by Rabbi Yannai (3rd C. CE). Rabbi Yannai cites part of a biblical verse (Proverbs 14:10) as his prooftext. The passage goes on to explore the meaning and relationship of Rabbi Yannai's view and the mishnah. In its reasoning, the sugya refers to a rule attributed to Rav Safra (4th C.) and then moves to the interpretation of Mar bar Rav Ashi (5th C.). Mar bar Rav Ashi advances a lenient position, which permits people to eat on Yom Kippur if they say it is necessary, even if 100 physicians are present. The anonymous voice of the Gemara interprets and affirms this leniency, closing with the passage's third citation of the phrase, "The Heart Knows its Own Bitterness."

==== Jerusalem Talmud ====
The Jerusalem Talmud which is earlier than the Babylonian, offers a statement on mishnah Yoma 8:5 that does not mention "The Heart Knows its Own Bitterness," yet it explicitly relies on the nearly exceptionless norm of the preservation of human life.

The sick person says, I can [fast the entire day], but the physician says, he cannot; one listens to the physician. The physician says, he can, but the sick person says, he cannot; one listens to the sick person. The only question is if the sick person says, I can, and the physician says, I do not know. Rabbi Abbahu in the name of Rabbi Yochanan (3rd C. CE): It is treated as an uncertainty of a danger to life, and any uncertainty of a danger to life pushes the Sabbath aside [and thus it certainly holds for Yom Kippur, whose violation is less severe than for the Sabbath].

According to Libson, for the fasting situation, both the Jerusalem and Babylonian Talmud versions elevated the value of the preservation of human life (pikuach nefesh). On their use of the Proverb, "The Heart Knows its Own Bitterness," Libson sees a dual purpose: "first, [the verse] anchors the argument that favours the individual’s own medical assessment of his condition over that of an external agent. Second, the verse relates the discussion of illness and self-knowledge to Yom Kippur in a more fundamental way," that is, a deeper religious meaning. As a further step, Libson deconstructs the sugya as having an early layer by amoraic rabbis and an edited layer of redaction that opens up another nuance that goes beyond patient self-knowledge into the spiritual grounds for fasting. She suggests that Hellenistic and Christian views, of the self and of suffering, may have influenced the redaction-era rabbis to treat Yom Kippur as an opportunity for self-regulated suffering: "Only the individual can correctly assess the bitterness for which she may be atoning on Yom Kippur, and therefore only the individual can engage in prohairesis, determining whether to risk pain and even life for the sake of purification and atonement."

=== Medieval and early modern developments ===
Along these lines, Libson mentions the case of a rabbi (a Tosafist, Isaac ben Asher) who fasted to death in the medieval period, earning some recognition for piety as well as push back on the rabbinic acceptance of such conduct.

Another Jewish ethical policy was derived from a close reading of the mishnah's phrase, "if there are no experts there." According to Rashi, this wording implies not only that experts are not there physically, but rather that they do not exist at all. In other words, there are no experts who can trump the patient's standpoint.

The sugya informs rabbinic understanding of the Biblical commandment to fast on Yom Kippur. Hence it is discussed in the 313th mitzvah of Sefer Ha-Chinuch, a 13th C. rabbinic law book. An authoritative source of rabbinic law, the Shulchan Aruch, uses the sugya of "The Hearts Knows its own Bitterness" to determine the behavior of a sick person on Yom Kippur. In Siman 618 of Orach Chayim, the Shulchan Aruch states that fasting would be waived based on the opinion of one expert, including a non-Jewish doctor, if the person's condition might worsen, even if the patient's life is not in danger. Yet if a person says they need food, the Shulchan Aruch holds that it does not matter how many doctors who say they should fast.

== Applications in contemporary Rabbinic ethics ==
=== Patient autonomy and health ===
In Jewish medical ethics, the sugya is at the heart of discussions about handling patient refusal to be fed. With several variables at play, Immanuel Jakobovits created a detailed chart for his pioneering Jewish Medical Ethics (1959).

The sugya also informs Jewish moral reasoning for situations where the patient want a specific medicine, even if not otherwise medically indicated. For example, David ben Solomon ibn Abi Zimra (16th C.) wrote that, thanks to the principle of "The Heart Knows its Own Bitterness," a patient's treatment decisions should be honored, even for the sake of "peace of mind."

For Yom Kippur specifically, the Encyclopedia of Jewish Medical Ethics gives a digest of contemporary rabbinic ethics grounded in Yoma 83a: "If the patient says that he needs to eat he must be fed even if 100 physicians say that he does not need to eat. The reason is that a person's heart knows its own bitterness. He must first be reminded, however, that it is Yom Kippur. Nonetheless, one should not frighten him by telling him that today is Yom Kippur...."

As noted by bioethicist Daniel Sinclair, the principle of The Heart Knows it Own Bitterness can be invoked when medical treatment is doubted or resisted by patients. For example, Rabbi Hayim David HaLevi faced the case of a young man who refused chemotherapy and wanted homeopathy instead. Halevi allowed the young man to choose his treatment, based on The Heart Knows it Own Bitterness, deferring to the "subjective wishes and impressions of the patient" (as summarized by Sinclair).

The sugya has also been invoked in discussions of eating disorders in the Jewish community.

In a 2016 article on contemporary patient autonomy, Berger and Cahan state that Jewish medical ethicists tend to assume there is a correct medical decision to be made, so that patient autonomy is honored only in cases of medical uncertainty. Against this assumption, they argue that Jewish law can achieve a more robust version of patient autonomy with the sugya of The Heart Knows its Own Bitterness. For their argument, first they show that the Palestinian Talmud gives patients a choice whenever there is some minimal or doubtful risk to life. Second, they say that the sugya "introduces a major shift in [The Talmud's] understanding of how and why we defer to the patient or physician."

Berger and Cahan's point hinges on an interpretation of the final voice in the Talmudic passage, Mar Bar Rav Ashi. In this rabbi's view, the biblical phrase "The Heart Knows its Own Bitterness" means that the patient possesses knowledge about his own condition that is of a totally different nature than any expert's knowledge about it." In other words, there is a kind of medical self-knowledge that should be taken into account, thereby opening the scope of patient autonomy. Berger and Cahan conclude that patient self-knowledge should form a more nuanced conception of medical halakhah and that secular medical ethics would benefit from giving patients not only the right of decision but also some credit for knowledge of their experience of disease.

=== Progressive halakhah ===
In a 2022 law review article, Laynie Soloman and Russell G. Pearce deploy The Heart Knows its Own Bitterness as one of two principles for their constructive development of a progressive, "liberatory" approach to halakhic decision-making for heterodox (i.e., non-Orthodox) Jews, especially for those who experience a negative impact from traditionalist halakhah.

An illustrative use of the principle arose during early debates in non-Orthodox Conservative Judaism over homosexuality, as with this 1992 statement by Rabbi Harold M. Schulweis:

[W]hen I speak to these men and women they reveal that their preferential erotic attraction was not chosen, but discovered, and discovered with pain and anxiety. Their orientation is as given as my own heterosexuality, whether it is explained as an act of nature or of God. Who then could call such basic involuntary orientation immoral and justify its punishment? The testimony of these people must be heeded. When a person declares on Yom Kippur that he needs to eat food, we listen to him. “Even if a hundred expert physicians say that he does not need it, we listen to him—as the scripture says ‘The heart knows its own bitterness.’ (Proverbs 14:10).”

In anticipating the liberalization of Jewish attitudes to homosexuality, ethicist Dena Davis remarked that even more than genetic evidence of homosexuality as an immutable orientation, "testimony of lesbian and gay persons is.. probably even more powerful."

The principle has also been invoked for abortion rights and for cultural change in Jewish education.

Drawing on support from Libson, Soloman and Pearce state that The Heart Knows its Own Bitterness principle "elevates self-knowledge and individual agency" as it shifts expertise from rabbis to doctors, and from both groups to individuals, to the point that "expertise is now located in the individual as the halakhic actor and self-as-judge." Soloman and Pearce posit that a different kind of halakhah can emerge for non-traditionalist Jews by drawing on each "individual's own lived reality," enabling a halakhah that is shaped by Jewish trans and disabled bodies. They say that the principle also repositions halakhic discourse against normative rabbinic jurisprudence and embodies a core principle of disability justice: "Nothing about us without us."

To illustrate a Jewish legal ethics centered on The Heart Knows it own Bitterness, Soloman and Pearce describe the Trans Halakha Project, organized by Svara (a queer, radical yeshiva where Solomon was teaching), to create a Jewish law and ethics written by and for transgender Jews. In turn, this trans halakhah, they believe, could inspire similar liberatory projects for heterodox Jews. While applying The Heart Knows its Own Bitterness for a Jewish ethics by a those outside the mainstream, the authors say that such projects could be developed and expanded by groups with mixed identities (not all from a single impacted subgroup).

== Summary of the sugya ==
The Talmudic sugya elaborates on the second part of the mishna (Yoma 8:5), which considers the needs of a sick person:

It was taught in the mishna: If a person is ill and requires food due to potential danger, one feeds him according to the advice of medical experts. Rabbi Yannai said: If an ill person says he needs to eat, and a doctor says he does not need to eat, one listens to the ill person. What is the reason for this halakha? It is because the verse states: "The heart knows the bitterness of its soul" (Proverbs 14:10), meaning an ill person knows the intensity of his pain and weakness, and doctors cannot say otherwise.

— Yoma 83a, Babylonian Talmud

A Talmud voice (anonymous) then challenges Rabbi Yannai's view as too obvious, as if it adds nothing to the mishna. But the Talmud then says that Rabbi Yannai was making a novel point, that people know their own condition (and "suffering") better than a doctor, when the person says they want to eat on Yom Kippur.

Then Rabbi Yannai considers the reverse situation: if the person insists on fasting against medical guidance, then Jewish law expects that person to follow the doctor. Why? Because, says the Talmudic voice, it is better to assume that the person's judgment is impaired, due to their illness, and they underestimate their need to eat.

The sugya continues: (Note: English from The William Davidson digital edition of the Koren Noé Talmud, with commentary by Rabbi Adin Even-Israel Steinsaltz. Source: korenpub.com Digitization: Sefaria License: CC-BY-NC)

We learned in the mishna: If a person is ill, one feeds him according to the advice of medical experts. This implies that if there are experts present, then according to the advice of experts, yes, one feeds the ill person; but at his own instructions, no, one does not feed him, contrary to Rabbi Yannai’s opinion. It further implies that according to the advice of several experts, yes, one feeds an ill person; however, according to the advice of only one expert, no, one does not feed him.

— Yoma 83a-b, Babylonian Talmud

Responding to the second inference here, the Talmudic voice then points out that the mishnah requires a minimum of two experts. If so, that would contradict Rabbi Yannai's opinion that one enough to determine the person's fasting. To solve this problem, the Talmud narrows the presumed case of the mishna, "We are dealing with a unique circumstance: The ill person says I do not need food" and, moreover, two doctors are required because "there is another, third expert with him who says that the ill person does not need to eat." With this narrower scope, the Talmud is saying that the mishna means to ensure that a sick person, who wishes to fast, should not do so when two doctors are warning against it. Why? Because it is "a case of uncertainty concerning a life-threatening situation" and in all such cases, rabbinic law errs on the side of caution in order to protect life.

Since the mishna's case was turned into a two-against-one situation, the sugya then delves into the dynamics of conflicting views. First, it considers a situation when there are two doctors plus the patient, who say that fasting is acceptable, against two doctors who caution that the patient had better eat. Second, the sugya contrasts the matter of competing experts in a monetary case, where there amount of expert testimony matters, to the current case, which has "uncertainty concerning a life-threatening situation." Here the sugya finds that two doctors who call for eating are deemed to outweigh any number of doctors who side with the patient on fasting.

The Talmud concedes that, through this reasoning, the mishna does not appear to clearly express what it means. The anonymous voice of the Talmud then basically reconstructs the mishna: "The mishna is incomplete and is teaching the following: In what case is this statement that he may eat only based on the advice of experts said? It is when the ill person said: I do not need to eat. But if he said: I do need to eat, and instead of two experts there is only one who says that he does not need to eat, one feeds him according to his own opinion."

Finally, the Talmud brings the opinion of a rabbi who lived around the time that the Babylonian Talmud is said to have been finished. "Mar bar Rav Ashi said: Any instance where an ill person says: I need to eat, even if there are one hundred expert doctors who say that he does not need to eat, we listen to his own opinion and feed him, as it is stated: "The Heart Knows its own Bitterness" (Proverbs 14:10)."

With this pronouncement, the Talmud raises a final potential objection. It posits that the mishna seems to have implied that the sick person only follows their own opinion when there are no doctors around but, in the presence of doctors, they must be obeyed. The Talmud parries this last concern. It clarifies that the opinion of experts only matter when the ill person want to fast, and thereby declines to eat. But if the ill person "said: I do need to eat, it is considered as if there were no experts there at all; we feed him based on his opinion, as it is stated: "The Heart Knows its Own Bitterness" (Proverbs 14:10)." In other words, as the Steinsaltz commentary wraps up the sugya, "all the experts are ignored in the face of the ill person’s own sensitivities." (Source in note 2.)
