= Alcohol in the Bible =

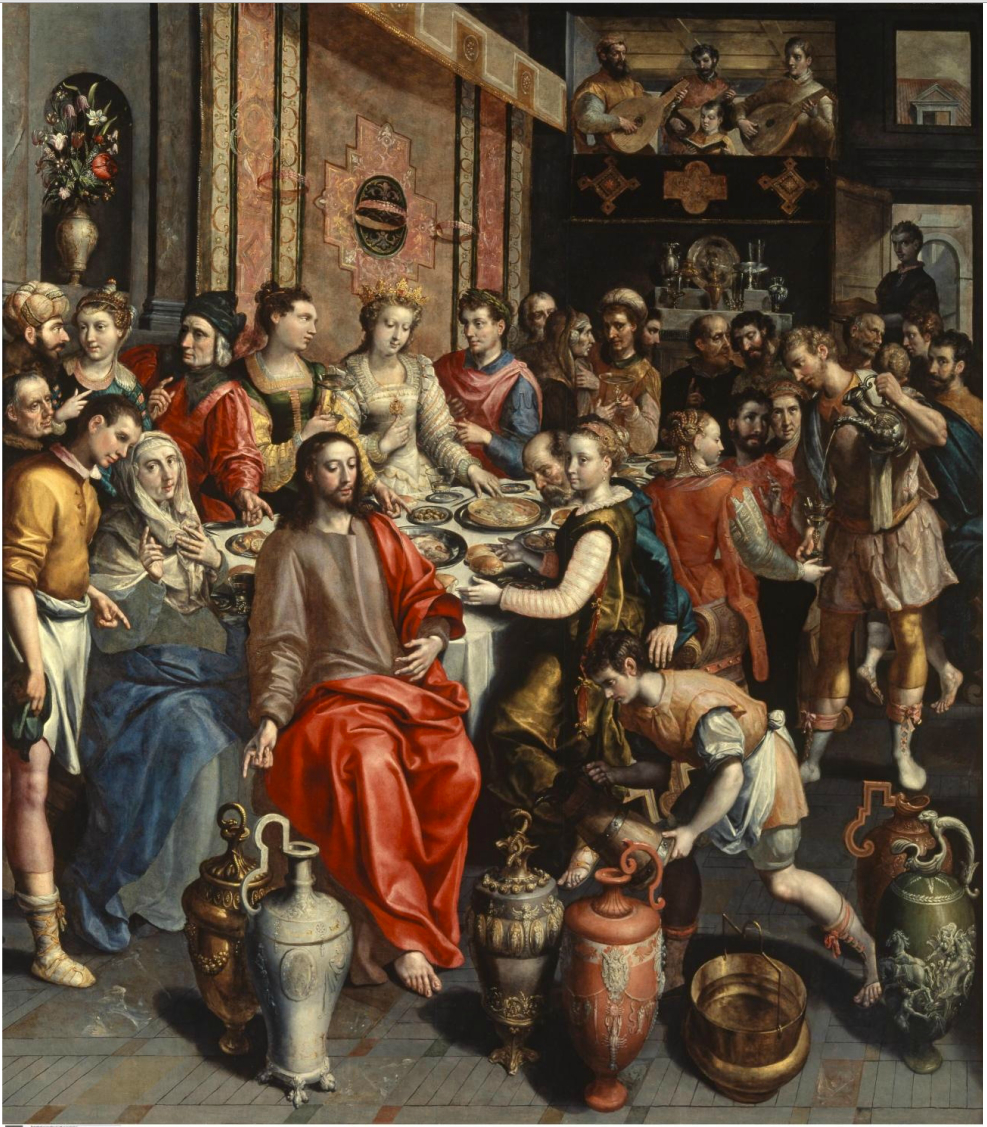
Jesus depicted transforming water into wine. Maerten de Vos, The Marriage at Cana, c. 1597, Cathedral of our Lady, Antwerp, Belgium.

Mention of alcoholic beverages appears in the Hebrew Bible, after Noah planted a vineyard and became inebriated. In the New Testament, Jesus miraculously made copious amounts of wine at the wedding at Cana (John 2). Wine is the most common alcoholic beverage mentioned in biblical literature, where it is a source of symbolism, and was an important part of daily life in biblical times. Additionally, the inhabitants of ancient Israel drank beer and wines made from fruits other than grapes, and references to these appear in scripture. However, the alcohol content of ancient alcoholic beverages was significantly lower than modern alcoholic beverages. The low alcohol content was due to the limitations of fermentation and the nonexistence of distillation methods in the ancient world. Rabbinic teachers wrote acceptance criteria on consumability of ancient alcoholic beverages after significant dilution with water, and prohibited undiluted wine.

In the early 19th century the temperance movement began. Evangelical Christians became prominent in this movement, and while previously almost all Christians had a much more relaxed attitude to alcohol, today many evangelical Christians abstain from alcohol. Bible verses would be interpreted in a way that encouraged abstinence, for example 1 Corinthians 10:21, which states, "You cannot drink the cup of the Lord and the cup of demons too..."

Historically, however, the main Christian interpretation of biblical literature displays an ambivalence toward drinks that can be intoxicating, considering them both a blessing from God that brings joy and merriment and potentially dangerous beverages that can be sinfully abused. The relationships between Judaism and alcohol and Christianity and alcohol have generally maintained this same tension, though some modern Christian sects, particularly American Protestant groups around the time of Prohibition, have rejected alcohol as evil. The original versions of the books of the Bible use several different words for alcoholic beverages: at least 10 in Hebrew, and five in Greek. Drunkenness is discouraged and occasionally portrayed, and some biblical persons abstained from alcohol. Wine is used symbolically, in both positive and negative terms. Its consumption is prescribed for religious rites or medicinal uses in some places.

== Lexigraphy ==
Biblical literature uses several words in its original languages to refer to different types of alcoholic beverages. Some of these words have overlapping meaning, particularly the words in the Hebrew language compared to the words in Koine Greek, the language of both the Septuagint and the New Testament. While some deuterocanonical books may have been originally written in Hebrew or the Aramaic language, some were written in Greek. Hence, the meanings of the words used for alcoholic beverages in each of these languages has bearing on alcohol in the Bible.

=== Hebrew ===
The Hebrew Bible was largely written in Biblical Hebrew, with portions in Biblical Aramaic, and has an important Ancient Greek translation called the Septuagint. The modern Hebrew Bible, which generally follows the Masoretic Text, uses several words to represent alcoholic beverages:

Hebrew	Transliteration	Strong's no.	Instances in OT	Biblical appearances	Meaning	Greek equivalent(s)
יין	yayin	3196	140		the common word translated "wine"	oinos (see below), gleukos (see below).
תירוש	tirosh	8492	38		properly "must"; sometimes rendered as "wine," "new wine," or "sweet wine." It can represent juice at any stage in the fermentation process, and in some places it "represents rather wine made from the first drippings of the juice before the winepress was trodden. As such it would be particularly potent."	oinos (most references; see below), methusma (once; see below)
שכר	shekar	7941	23		"strong drink"; "denotes any inebriating drink with about 7–10 percent alcoholic content, not hard liquor, because there is no evidence of distilled liquor in ancient times.... It was made from either fruit and/or barley beer"; the term can include wine, but generally it is used in combination with it ("wine and strong drink") to encompass all varieties of intoxicants	sikera (see below), methê ("strong drink, drunkenness"), methusma (see below), oinos (see below)
חמר	chemer, corresponding to the Aramaic chamar	2561, 2562	7		"wine"; the word "conveys the idea of 'foaming,' as in the process of fermentation, or when poured out. It is derived from the root hamar, meaning 'to boil up'"	oinos (see below), methê ("strong drink, drunkenness")
עסיס	'asis	6071	5		"sweet wine" or "new wine", the vintage of the current year with intoxicating power	glukasmos ("sweetness, sweet wine"), methê ("strong drink, "drunkenness"), nama, oinos neos ("new wine")
חמץ	chomets	2558	6		vinegar, which was made from wine or other fermented beverage and used as a condiment or, when mixed with water, a slightly intoxicating drink	oxos (see below), omphax ("unripe or sour grape"),
שמר	shemar, (pl: shemarim)	8105	5		lees or dregs of wine; "wine that has been kept on the lees, and therefore old wine" ("if [the wine] were designed to be kept for some time a certain amount of lees was added to give it body")	oinos (see below), trugias ("full of lees")
סבא	sobhe	5435	3		drink, liquor, wine	oinos (see below)
ממסך	mamsak and mesekh	4469, 4538	3		"mixed drink," "mixed wine," "drink-offering;" the word is "properly a mixture of wine and water with spices that increase its stimulating properties."	kerasma ("mixture")
מזג	mezeg	4197	1		"mixture", "mixed wine"	krama ("mixture, especially mixed wine")

=== Greek ===
The New Testament (Koine Greek) and Septuagint Greek words:

Greek	Transliteration	Strong's no.	Instances in NT	Biblical appearances	Meaning	Hebrew equivalent(s)
οίνος	oinos	3631	33	NT and Septuagint	the common word translated "wine" in the New Testament and Septuagint.	(corresponding to masoretic yayin, tirosh, chemer, shekar, sobhe, shemarim, and 'asis)
οἶνον νέον	oinon neon	3631, 3501	8	NT and Septuagint	new wine – it was put into new wine-skins and both were preserved.	'asis
γενήματος τῆς ἀμπέλου	genematos tes ampelou	1081 3588 288	3	NT and Septuagint	"fruit of the vine" – the only New Testament term to describe the contents of the cup at the Last Supper.	pri ha'gafen
γλευκος	gleukos	1098	1	NT and Septuagint	"sweet wine" (sometimes rendered "new wine"), a beverage mentioned to be intoxicating in Acts 2:13.	yayin, mathaq, mamtaq (for "fresh" water, sweet).
όξος	oxos	3690	7	NT and Septuagint	vinegar, sour wine; could be made from grape wine or other fermented beverages; when mixed with water, it was a common, cheap drink of the poor and of the Roman army	chomets
σίκερα	sikera	4608	1	NT and Septuagint	a Hebrew loanword from shekar meaning "strong drink."	shekar
μέθυσμα	methusma	–	–	Septuagint only	an intoxicating drink	(corresponding to masoretic tirosh on a single occasion, and to shekar on all others)
οἰνοπότης	oinopotes	3630	2	NT and Septuagint	"a wine drinker" (oinos, and potes, "a drinker"), is used in Matthew 11:19; Luke 7:34. In the Sept., Proverbs 23:20.	sawbaw yayin

=== Alcoholic content of beverages in the ancient world ===
Yayin and oinos (which in the Septuagint also often translates most of the Hebrew words for alcoholic beverages listed above) are commonly translated "wine", but the two are also rarely, and perhaps figuratively or anticipatorily, used to refer to freshly pressed non-alcoholic juice. For this reason, prohibitionist and some abstentionist Christians object to taking the default meaning to be fermented beverages, but others argue that the words can also refer to alcoholic beverages.

After the conquest of Palestine by Alexander the Great, the Hellenistic custom of diluting wine had taken hold such that the author of 2 Maccabees speaks of diluted wine as "a more pleasant drink" and of both undiluted wine and unmixed water as "harmful" or "distasteful."

Alcoholic wine in the ancient world was significantly different than modern wines in that it had much lower alcohol content and was consumed after significant dilution with water (as attested by even other cultures surrounding Israel), thus rendering its alcoholic content negligible by modern standards. The low alcohol content was due to the limitations of fermentation in the ancient world. From the Mishnah and Talmuds, the common dilution rate for consumption by Jews was 3 parts water to 1 part wine (3:1 dilution ratio). Wine in the ancient world had a maximum possible alcohol content of 11-12 percent before dilution and once diluted, the alcohol content was reduced to a maximum of 2.75 or 3 percent. Estimates of the wine of regional neighbors like the Greeks have dilution of 1:1 or 2:1 which place the alcohol content at a maximum of between 4-7 percent.

The adjective “unmixed” (ἄκρατος) is used in the ancient texts to designate undiluted wine, but the New Testament never uses this adjective to describe the wine consumed by Jesus or the disciples, or to describe the wine approved for use in moderation by Christians. Though ancient rabbis opposed the consumption of undiluted wine as a beverage, they taught that it was useful as a medicine.

Common dilution ratios from the ancient world were compiled by Athenaus of Naucratis in Deipnosophistae (Banquet of the Learned; c. AD 228):

Ancient source	Dilution Ratio (Water:Wine)
Homer	20:1
Pliny	8:1
Alexis	4:1
Hesiod	3:1
Ion	3:1
Nichochares	5:2
Aristophanes	2:1 or 3:1
Anacreon	2:1
Diocles	2:1

== Biblical references ==
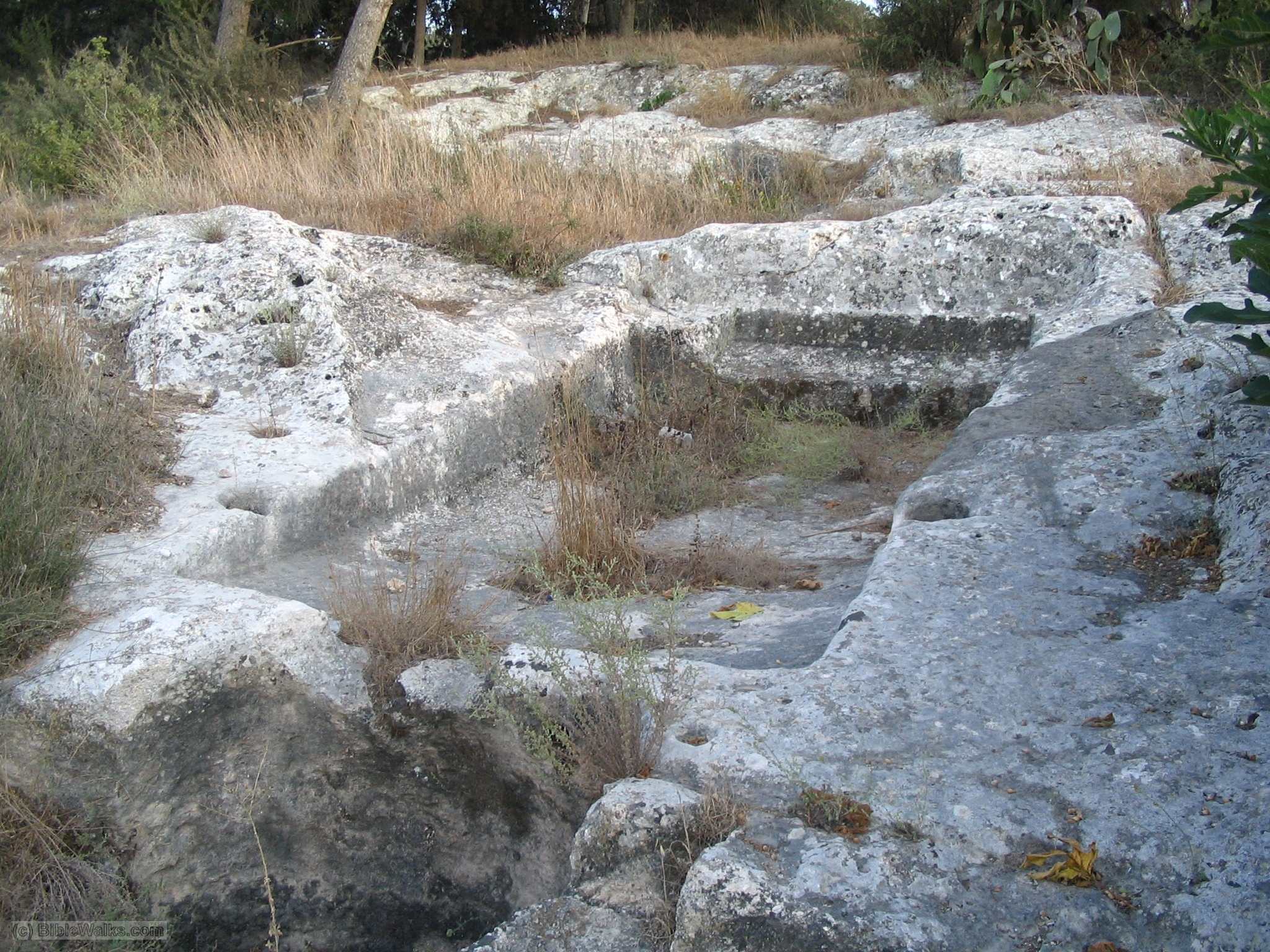
Ancient wine press in Israel with the pressing area in the center and the collection vat off to the bottom left

The many biblical references to wine are both positive and negative, real and symbolic, descriptive and didactic. Both archaeological evidence and written records indicate the significant cultivation of grapes in ancient Israel and the popularity of wine-drinking. The production capacity apparent from archaeological remains and the frequent biblical references to wine suggest that it was the principal alcoholic beverage of the ancient Israelites.

In biblical narratives, the fermentation of fruit into wine holds significance, with grapes and wine often linked to both celebration and cautionary tales of sin and temptation, reminiscent of the concept of the forbidden fruit.

=== Drunkenness ===
Easton's Bible Dictionary states: "The sin of drunkenness ... must have been not uncommon in the olden times, for it is mentioned either metaphorically or literally more than seventy times in the Bible", though some suggest it was a "vice of the wealthy rather than of the poor". Biblical interpreters generally agree that the Hebrew and Christian scriptures condemn ordinary drunkenness as a serious spiritual and moral failing in passages such as these (all from the New International Version):

- Proverbs 23:20f: "Do not mix with winebibbers, or gluttonous eaters of meat, for drunkards and gluttons become poor, and drowsiness clothes them in rags."
- Isaiah 5:11f: "Woe to those who rise early in the morning to run after their drinks, who stay up late at night till they are inflamed with wine. They have harps and lyres at their banquets, tambourines and flutes and wine, but they have no regard for the deeds of the LORD, no respect for the work of his hands."
- Galatians 5:19–21: "The acts of the sinful nature are obvious: ... drunkenness, orgies, and the like. I warn you, as I did before, that those who live like this will not inherit the kingdom of God."
- Ephesians 5:18: "Do not get drunk on wine, which leads to debauchery. Instead, be filled with the Spirit."

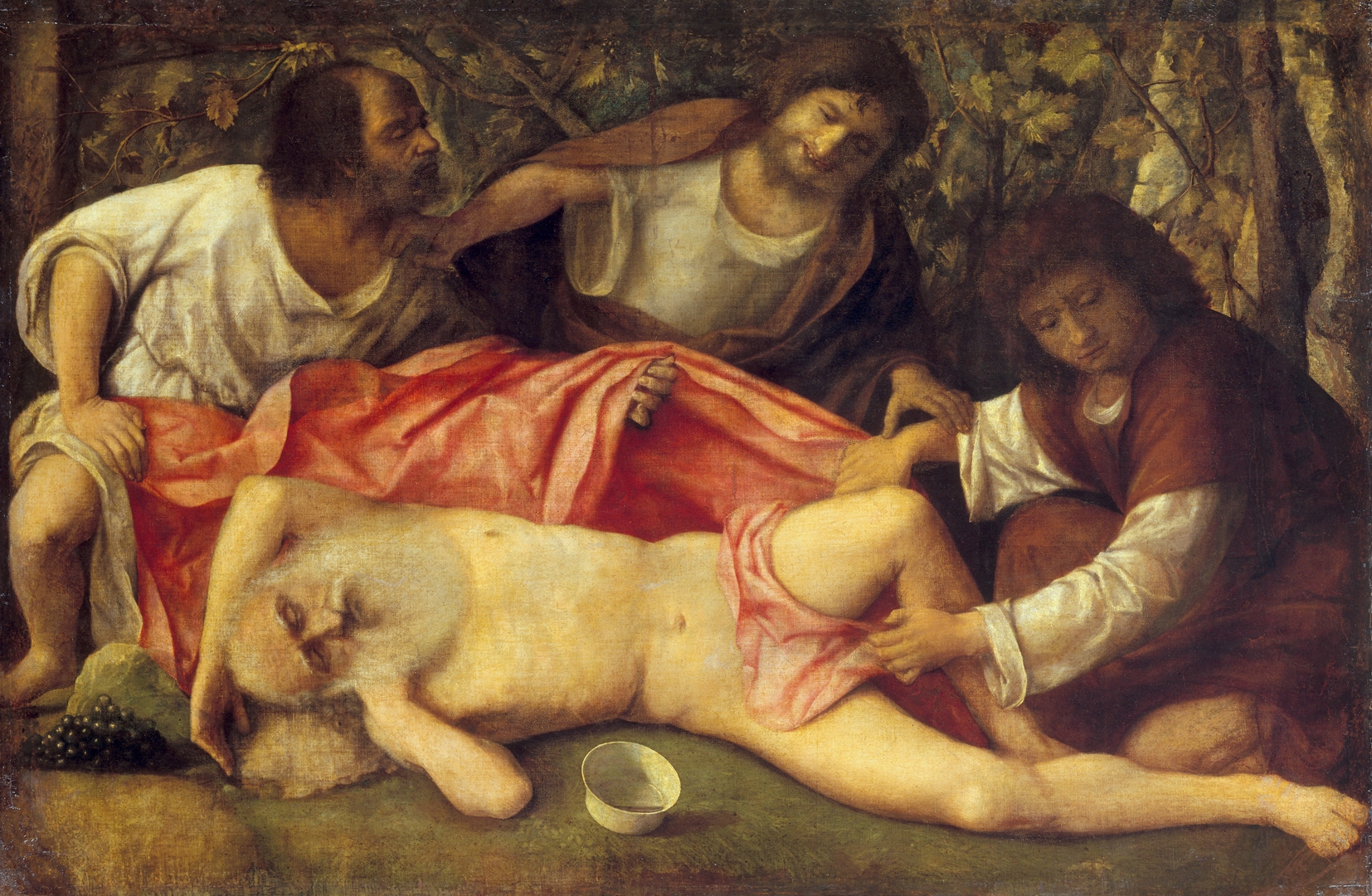
Drunkenness of Noah by Giovanni Bellini, c. 1515

The consequences of the drunkenness of Noah and Lot "were intended to serve as examples of the dangers and repulsiveness of intemperance." The title character in the Book of Judith uses the drunkenness of the Assyrian general Holofernes to behead him in a heroic victory for the Jewish people and an embarrassing defeat for the general, who had schemed to seduce Judith.

One of the original sections of 1 Esdras describes a debate among three courtiers of Darius I of Persia over whether wine, the king, or women (but above all the truth) is the strongest. The argument for wine does not prevail in the contest, but it provides a vivid description of the ancients' view of the power wine can wield in excessive quantity.

A disputed but important passage is Proverbs 31:4–7:

4 It is not for kings, O Lemuel, it is not for kings to drink wine; nor for princes strong drink:
5 Lest they drink, and forget the law, and pervert the judgment of any of the afflicted.
6 Give strong drink unto him that is ready to perish, and wine unto those that be of heavy hearts.
7 Let him drink, and forget his poverty, and remember his misery no more.

Some Christians assert that alcohol was prohibited to kings at all times, while most interpreters contend that only its abuse is in view here. Some argue that the latter instructions regarding the perishing should be understood as sarcasm when compared with the preceding verses, while others contend the beer and wine are intended as a cordial to raise the spirits of the perishing, while some suggest that the Bible is here authorizing alcohol as an anesthetic. Moreover, some suggest that the wine ("vinegar" or "sour wine") which Roman soldiers offered to Jesus at his crucifixion was also intended as an anesthetic.

=== Sacrifices and feasts ===
The Hebrew scriptures prescribed wine for use in festal celebrations and sacrificial rituals. In particular, fermented wine was presented daily as a drink offering, as part of the first Fruits offering, and as part of various supplementary offerings. Wine was kept in the Temple in Jerusalem, and the king had his own private stores. The banquet hall was called a "house of wine," and wine was used as the usual drink at most secular and religious feasts, including feasts of celebration and hospitality, tithe celebrations, Jewish holidays such as Passover, and at burials.

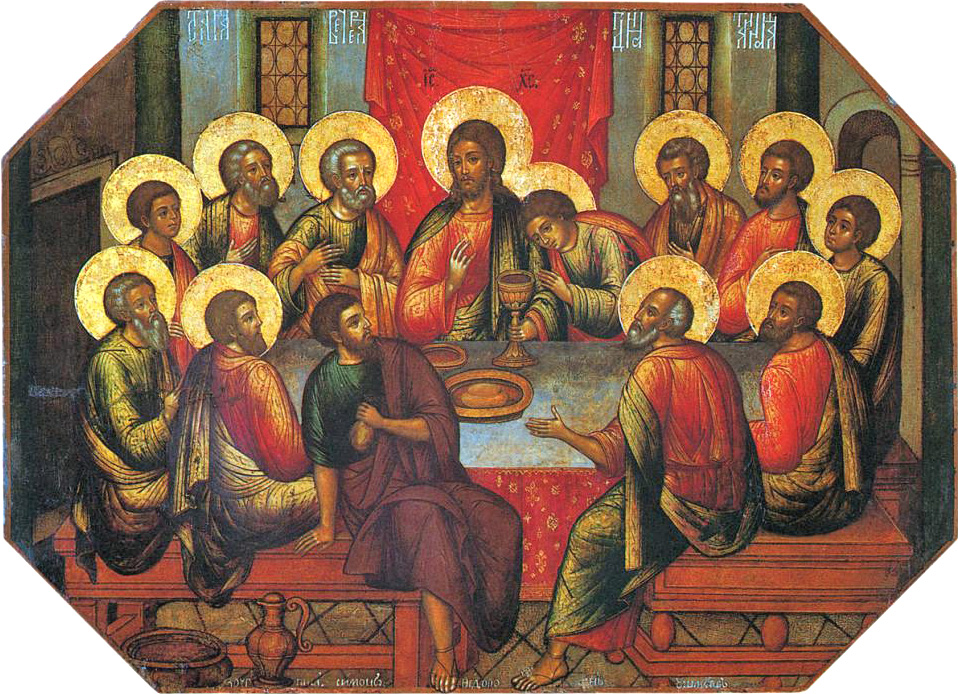
The Last Supper by Simon Ushakov, 1685. Jesus holds a chalice containing wine.

The first miracle of Jesus' public ministry was transforming water into fine wine at a wedding in Cana. Jesus instituted the Eucharist at the Last Supper, which took place at a Passover celebration, and set apart the bread and "fruit of the vine" that were present there as symbols of the New Covenant. Saint Paul later chides the Corinthians for becoming drunk on wine served at their celebrations of the Lord's Supper.

=== Bringer of joy ===
The Bible also speaks of wine in general terms as a bringer and concomitant of joy, particularly in the context of nourishment and feasting, e.g.:

- Psalm 104:14–15: "[The LORD] makes ... plants for man to cultivate – bringing forth food from the earth: wine that gladdens the heart of man, oil to make his face shine, and bread that sustains his heart." Gregory of Nyssa (died 395) made a distinction between types of wine (intoxicating and non-intoxicating) – "not that wine which produces drunkenness, plots against the senses, and destroys the body, but such as gladdens the heart, the wine which the Prophet recommends"
- Ecclesiastes 9:7: "Go, eat your food with gladness, and drink your wine with a joyful heart, for it is now that God favors what you do."

Ben Sira discusses the use of wine in several places, emphasizing joy, prudence, and common sense.

=== Vows and duties ===
Certain persons were forbidden in the Hebrew Bible to partake of wine because of their vows and duties. Kings were forbidden to abuse alcohol lest their judgments be unjust. It was forbidden to priests on duty, though the priests were given "the finest new wine" from the first fruits offerings for drinking outside the tabernacle and temple.

The Nazirites excluded as part of their ascetic regimen not only wine, but also vinegar, grapes, and raisins, though when Nazirites completed the term of their vow they were required to present wine as part of their sacrificial offerings and could drink of it. While John the Baptist adopted such a regimen, Jesus did not during his three years of ministry.

The Rechabites, a sub-tribe of the Kenites, vowed never to drink wine, live in houses, or plant fields or vineyards, not because of any "threat to wise living" from the latter [Prov. 20:1] practices, but because of their commitment to a nomadic lifestyle by not being bound to any particular piece of land. The Rechabites's strict obedience to the command of their father "not to drink wine" [Jer. 35:14] is commended and is contrasted with the failure of Jerusalem and the Kingdom of Judah to listen to their God.

During the Babylonian captivity, Daniel and his fellow Jews abstained from the meat and wine given to them by the king because they saw it as defiling in some way, though precisely how these would have defiled the Jews is not apparent in the text. A later passage implies that Daniel did drink wine at times, though it may not have been the king's. Similarly, Judith refused the Assyrian general's wine, though she drank wine from the stores she brought with her.

Christians are instructed regarding abstinence and their duty toward immature Christians: "All food is clean, but it is wrong for a man to eat anything that causes someone else to stumble. It is better not to eat meat or drink wine or to do anything else that will cause your brother to fall."

=== Symbolism and metaphor ===
The commonness and centrality of wine in daily life in biblical times is apparent from its many positive and negative metaphorical uses throughout the Bible. Positively, free wine is used as a symbol of divine grace, and wine is repeatedly compared to intimate love in the Song of Solomon. Negatively, wine is personified as a mocker ("[t]he most hardened apostate" in the Book of Proverbs whose chief sin is pride) and beer a brawler (one who is "mocking, noisy, and restless").

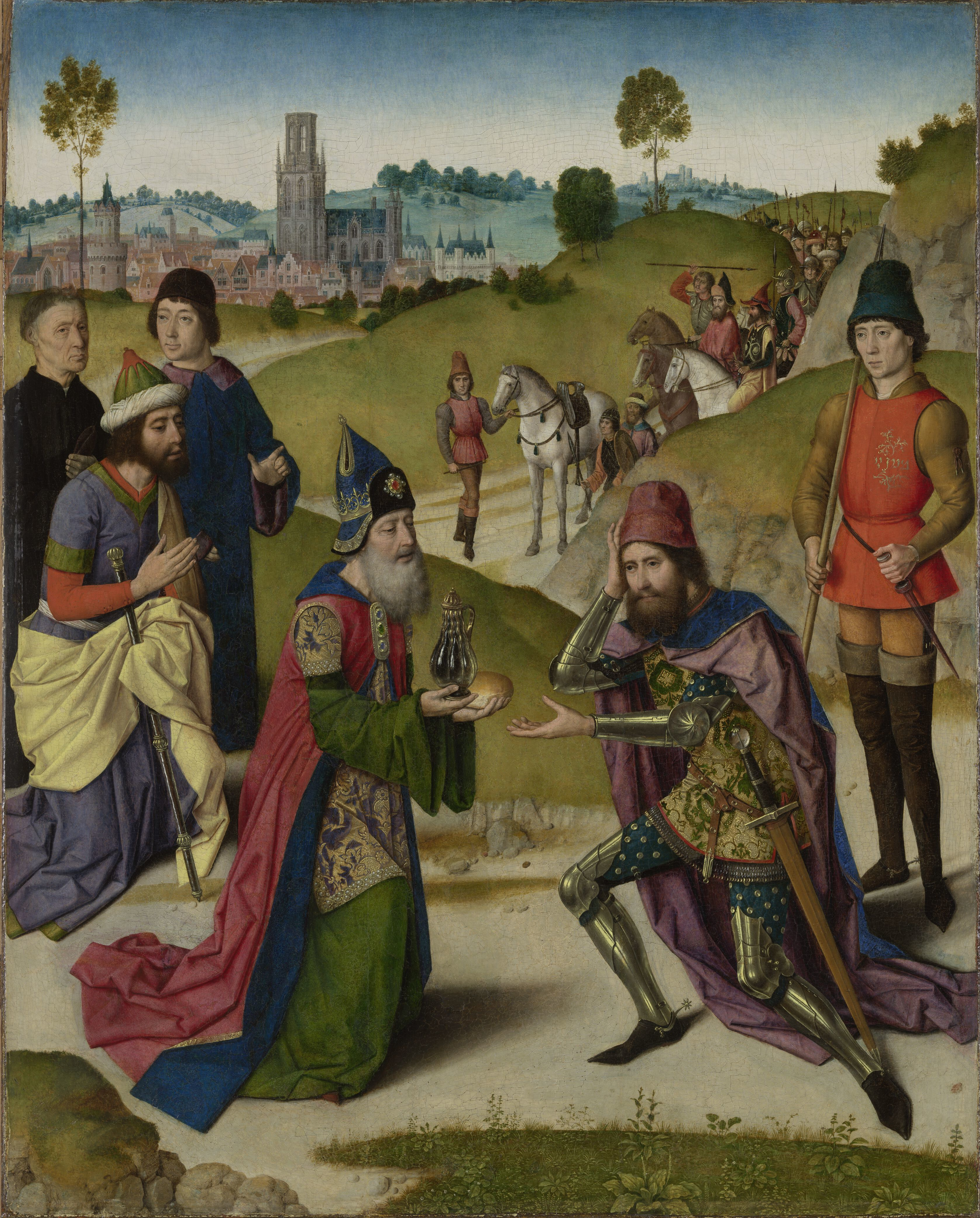
Meeting of Abraham and Melchizedek by Dieric Bouts the Elder, 1464-1468

Additionally, the chosen people and kingdom of God are compared to a divinely owned vine or vineyard in several places, and the image of new wine being kept in new wineskins, a process that would burst old wineskins, represents that the new faith Jesus was bringing "cannot be contained within the framework of the old." The complacent are compared with "wine left on its dregs" too long, such that it lacks a good taste and is of no value, and those who are corrupt are compared with excellent wine which has been diluted with water.

Wine was also used as a symbol of blessing and judgement throughout the Bible. Melchizedek blessed and refreshed Abraham's army with bread and wine; Isaac blessed Jacob by saying, "May God give you of heaven's dew and of earth's richness – an abundance of grain and new wine"; and when Jacob blessed his sons, he used a great abundance of wine as a symbol of Judah's prosperity. The nation of Israel was promised abundant wine and other central crops such as grain and oil if they kept God's covenant commandments, and their wine would be taken away as a curse if the Israelites failed to keep the covenant.

Drinking a cup of strong wine to the dregs and getting drunk are sometimes presented as a symbol of God's judgement and wrath, and Jesus alludes this cup of wrath, which he several times says he himself will drink. Similarly, the winepress is pictured as a tool of judgement where the resulting wine symbolizes the blood of the wicked who were crushed. Connected also to the cup of judgement is the wine of immorality, which the evil drink and which both brings and is part of the wrath of God.

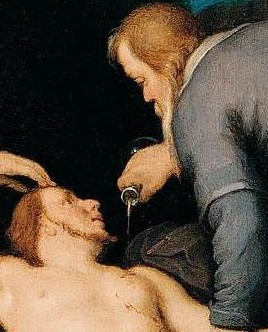
Detail from The Good Samaritan by Cornelis van Haarlem (1627) showing the Samaritan pouring oil and wine on the injured man's wounds

The Day of the Lord, which is often understood by Christians to usher in the Messianic Age, is depicted as a time when "[n]ew wine will drip from the mountains and flow from all the hills," when God's people will "plant vineyards and drink their wine," and when God himself "will prepare a feast of rich food for all peoples, a banquet of aged wine – the best of meats and the finest of wines."

In the New Testament, Jesus uses wine at the Last Supper to signify the "New Covenant in [Jesus'] blood," but Christians differ over precisely how symbolic the wine is in the continuing ritual of the Eucharist.

=== Medicinal uses ===
Wine was used in ancient times for various medicinal ends, and the Bible refers to some of these practices. It was likely used as an anesthetic to dull pain, and many interpreters suggest that it was in this capacity that wines were offered to Jesus at his crucifixion.

In the Parable of the Good Samaritan, Jesus tells a story about a man from Samaria who assists an injured man by, among other things, pouring oil and wine on his wounds. Oil mixed with wine was a common remedy in the ancient world to cleanse wounds and assuage their pain.

Paul advises Timothy that he should not drink water only, but should use a little wine for the sake of his stomach and frequent infirmities. Some have suggested this advice is particularly in reference to purifying low quality drinking water, while others suggest it was simply intended to help his digestion and general sickliness. Abstentionists generally regard this passage as a positive example of abstention from wine and see Paul's instructions as exceptional and purely for the sake of health, while other interpreters suggest that Timothy was "upright in his aims" but here guilty of an "excess of severity" or that he felt inappropriately bound by a Hellenistic custom that younger men should not drink.

=== Reading the Bible as having no positive references to alcohol ===
There are some who interpret certain passages in the Bible as not referring to alcohol, arguing that all positive references to "wine" in Scripture refer to non-alcoholic beverages (specifically, grape juice) and all negative references speak of alcoholic beverages. Advocates of this view, called the "two-wine" position, argue that the Greek and Hebrew words rendered "wine" in most English versions are generic terms for fruit juices; context determines if the beverage in view is alcoholic or not. The fact is pointed out that even in earlier stages of the English language, such as in 1611 when the King James Version was translated, "wine" could refer to non-alcoholic beverages as well as alcoholic ones. The two-wine view is widespread in conservative Evangelicalism. Dr. Robert Teachout, a fundamental Baptist seminary professor, argued for this position in his 1979 doctoral dissertation The Use of "Wine" in the Old Testament. Methodist (inclusve of the holiness movement) and Baptist support for a biblical total abstinence position is widespread. Other sources for this view include the Purified Translation of the Bible, where extensive footnotes are used to promote the idea, and the 19th century Temperance Bible Commentary.

== Works cited ==
- Magen Broshi (1984). "Wine in Ancient Palestine – Introductory Notes". Israel Museum Journal. III: 21–40.
- Magen Broshi (1986). "The Diet of Palestine in the Roman Period – Introductory Notes". Israel Museum Journal. V: 41–56.
- W. R. F. Browning (2004) [1996]. "Wine". A Dictionary of the Bible. Oxford University Press, USA. ISBN 978-0-19-860890-5.
- Ross, Thomas D., "And be not drunk with wine, but be filled with the Spirit," in The Doctrine of Sanctification, Ph. D. Dissertation, Great Plains Baptist Divinity School, 2014
- Teachout, Robert P., The Use of "Wine" In the Old Testament. Th. D. Dissertation, Dallas Theological Seminary, May 1979
- M. D. Coogan (1993). "Wine". In Bruce Metzger and M. D. Coogan (ed.). The Oxford Companion to the Bible. Oxford University Press, USA. ISBN 978-0-19-504645-8.
- W. Dommershausen (1990). "Yayin". In G. Johannes Botterweck; Helmer Ringgren (eds.). Theological Dictionary of the Old Testament. Vol. VI. trans. David E. Green. Wm. B. Eerdmans. ISBN 0-8028-2330-0.
- Ralph Earle (1986). "1 Timothy 5:13". Word Meanings in the New Testament. Kansas City, Missouri: Beacon Hill Press. ISBN 0-8341-1176-4.
- Matthew George Easton (1897a). "Vinegar". Easton's Bible Dictionary.
- Matthew George Easton (1897b). "Wine". Easton's Bible Dictionary.
- F. S. Fitzsimmonds (1982). "Wine and Strong Drink". In J. D. Douglas (ed.). New Bible Dictionary (2nd ed.). Downers Grove, Illinois: InterVarsity Press. ISBN 0-8308-1441-8.
- R. Laird Harris; Gleason Archer; Bruce Waltke (1980). Theological Wordbook of the Old Testament. Moody. ISBN 9780802486318.
- Edwin Hatch & Henry Adeney Redpath (1998). Concordance to the Septuagint. with an extensive Hebrew index by Takamitsu Muraoka appended (2nd ed.). Baker Academic. ISBN 978-0-8010-2141-1.
- Hans Wolfgang Heidland (1967). "όξος". In Gerhard Kittel and Ronald E. Pitkin (ed.). Theological Dictionary of the New Testament. Vol. V. trans. Geoffrey W. Bromiley. Wm. B. Eerdmans. ISBN 0-8028-2247-9.
- William Kaiser; Duane Garrett, eds. (2006). "Wine and Alcoholic Beverages in the Ancient World". Archaeological Study Bible. Zondervan. ISBN 978-0-310-92605-4.
- D. Kellermann (1986). "Chomets [et al.]". In G. Johannes Botterweck; Helmer Ringgren (eds.). Theological Dictionary of the Old Testament. Vol. IV. trans. David E. Green. Wm. B. Eerdmans. ISBN 0-8028-2328-9.
- Frederic Richard Lees & Dawson Burns (1870). "Appendix C-D". The Temperance Bible-Commentary. New York: National Temperance Society and Publication House. pp. 431–446.
- Henry Liddell; Robert Scott; Henry Stuart Jones; Roderick McKenzie (1940). A Greek-English Lexicon. Oxford: Clarendon Press. ISBN 0-19-864226-1.
- Bruce Lincoln (2005). "Beverages". In Lindsay Jones (ed.). Encyclopedia of Religion. Vol. 2 (2nd ed.). MacMillan Reference Books. ISBN 978-0-02-865733-2.
- Jill Maynard, ed. (1997a). "Drunkenness". Illustrated Dictionary of Bible Life & Times. Pleasantville, New York: The Reader's Digest Association.
- Jill Maynard, ed. (1997b). "Wine". Illustrated Dictionary of Bible Life & Times. Pleasantville, New York: The Reader's Digest Association.
- Jill Maynard, ed. (1997c). "Wine Making". Illustrated Dictionary of Bible Life & Times. Pleasantville, New York: The Reader's Digest Association.
- John McClintock; James Strong (1891). "Wine". Cyclopaedia of Biblical, Theological, and Ecclesiastical Literature. Vol. X. New York: Harper and Brothers. pp. 1010–1017.
- M. S. Miller; J. L. Miller (1996). "The Life of the Farmer: Land Use and Crops". Harper's Encyclopedia of Bible Life (3rd ed.). Castle Books. ISBN 0-7858-0726-8.
- Leon Morris (1995). "Additional Note H: The Last Supper and the Passover". The Gospel According to John. New International Commentary on the New Testament (revised ed.). Wm. B. Eerdmans. ISBN 978-0-8028-2504-9.
- "The New Testament Greek Lexicon (based on Thayer's and Smith's Bible Dictionary plus others)". Archived from the original on 21 January 2007.
- "The Old Testament Hebrew Lexicon (based on the Brown, Driver, Briggs, Gesenius Hebrew and English Lexicon)". Archived from the original on 17 January 2007.
- R. V. Pierard (1984). "Alcohol, Drinking of". In Walter A. Elwell (ed.). Evangelical Dictionary of Theology. Grand Rapids, MI: Baker Book House. ISBN 0-8010-3413-2.
- Pratt, Richard L. (2003). The Spirit of the Reformation Study Bible. Zondervan. ISBN 978-0-310-92360-2.
- I. W. Raymond (1970) [1927]. The Teaching of the Early Church on the Use of Wine and Strong Drink. AMS Press. ISBN 978-0-404-51286-6.
- Heinrich Seesemann (1967). "οινος". In Gerhard Kittel and Ronald E. Pitkin (ed.). Theological Dictionary of the New Testament. Vol. V. trans. Geoffrey W. Bromiley. Wm. B. Eerdmans. ISBN 0-8028-2247-9.
- Joseph Henry Thayer (1977) [1901]. A Greek-English Lexicon of the New Testament. Baker. ISBN 0-8010-8872-0.
- "Tractate Berakoth 6.1".
- Bruce Waltke (2004). The Book Of Proverbs: Chapters 1–15. New International Commentary on the Old Testament. Wm. B. Eerdmans. ISBN 978-0-8028-2545-2.
- Bruce Waltke (2005). The Book of Proverbs: Chapters 15–31. New International Commentary on the Old Testament. Wm. B. Eerdmans. ISBN 978-0-8028-2776-0.
- Jeff Yelton (2019). Wine in the Lord's Supper. self-published.
