= Job 8 =

8th chapter of the Book of Job

- ← chapter 7 chapter 9 →
- The whole Book of Job in the Leningrad Codex (1008 C.E.) from an old facsimile edition.
- Book: Book of Job
- Hebrew Bible part: Ketuvim
- Order in the Hebrew part: 3
- Category: Sifrei Emet
- Christian Bible part: Old Testament
- Order in the Christian part: 18

Job 8 is the eighth chapter of the Book of Job in the Hebrew Bible or the Old Testament of the Christian Bible. The book is anonymous; most scholars believe it was written around 6th century BCE. This chapter records the speech of Bildad (one of Job's friends), which belongs to the Dialogue section of the book, comprising Job 3:1–31:40.

== Text ==
The original text is written in Hebrew language. This chapter is divided into 22 verses.

=== Textual witnesses ===
Some early manuscripts containing the text of this chapter in Hebrew are of the Masoretic Text, which includes the Aleppo Codex (10th century), and Codex Leningradensis (1008). Fragments containing parts of this chapter in Hebrew were found among the Dead Sea Scrolls including 4Q100 (4QJob^{b}; 50–1 BCE) with extant verses 15–17.

There is also a translation into Koine Greek known as the Septuagint, made in the last few centuries BC; some extant ancient manuscripts of this version include Codex Vaticanus (B; $\mathfrak{G}$^{B}; 4th century), Codex Sinaiticus (S; BHK: $\mathfrak{G}$^{S}; 4th century), and Codex Alexandrinus (A; $\mathfrak{G}$^{A}; 5th century).

== Analysis ==
The structure of the book is as follows:

- The Prologue (chapters 1–2)
- The Dialogue (chapters 3–31)
- The Verdicts (32:1–42:6)
- The Epilogue (42:7–17)

Within the structure, chapter 8 is grouped into the Dialogue section with the following outline:

- Job's Self-Curse and Self-Lament (3:1–26)
- Round One (4:1–14:22)
  - Eliphaz (4:1–5:27)
  - Job (6:1–7:21)
  - Bildad (8:1–22)
    - The Essence of Bildad's Argument (8:1–7)
    - The Basis of Bildad's View (8:8–10)
    - Discursive Comments (8:11–19)
    - An Optimistic Finish (8:20–22)
  - Job (9:1–10:22)
  - Zophar (11:1–20)
  - Job (12:1–14:22)
- Round Two (15:1–21:34)
- Round Three (22:1–27:23)
- Interlude – A Poem on Wisdom (28:1–28)
- Job's Summing Up (29:1–31:40)

The Dialogue section is composed in the format of poetry with distinctive syntax and grammar. Chapter 8 record Bildad's first response to Job, which can be divided into several distinct sections:

- Verses 1–7 contain Bildad's core argument that God will not pervert justice.
- Verses 8–10 outline the authority for this argument
- Verses 11–19 present one side of Bildad's doctrine of retributive justice (the punishment of the wicked)
- Verses 20–22 finish with an optimistic note, leaving a possibility that Job will be vindicated because he is righteous.

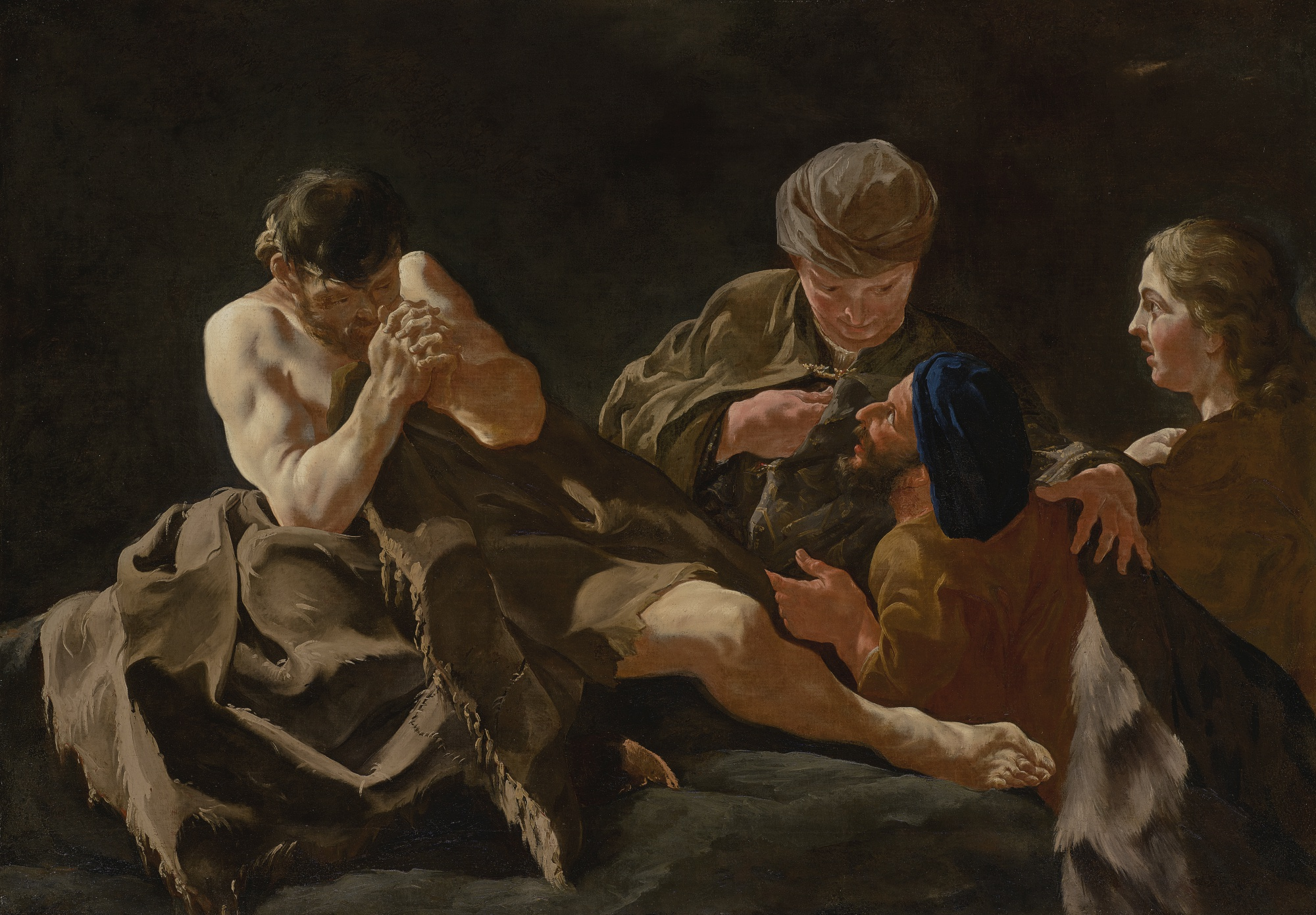
"Eliphaz, Bildad and Zophar consoling Job", by Giulia Lama (c. 1730s).

== The essence and basis of Bildad's argument (8:1–10) ==
Bildad is the second of Job's friends to speak (verse 1) and he regards Job's words as inappropriate, so he rebukes Job based on his principle that Almighty God will not pervert justice or righteousness. This is in contrast to Eliphaz's approach of God's utter holiness. Bildad believes that suffering is punishment, so the death of Job's children is proof that they have sinned (verse 4–7). The source of Bildad's argument is the long-held traditions, those searched out by former generations and appeared to have stood the test of time (verses 8–10).

=== Verse 2 ===
[Bildad said:] "How long will you speak these things,

and the words of your mouth be like a strong wind?"

- "Strong": from the Hebrew word כַּבִּיר, kab-bîr, also "great" or "mighty", which implies both "abundance" and "greatness" in some aspects of "strength"; it is found only in Book of Job and Isaiah. The use of this word to modify the noun "wind" (רוח כַּבִּיר, rū-aḥ kab-bîr; "strong wind") is to point that Job's words are full of sound but without solid content. This is different from the Hebrew term רוח גדולה, rū-aḥ gə-ḏō-w-lāh for the "great wind" that caused the death of Job's children (Job 1:19).

=== Verse 3 ===
[Bildad said:] "Does God pervert judgment?

Or does the Almighty pervert justice?"

- "God": from the Hebrew word הַ֭אֵל, ha-’êl.
- "Almighty": from the Hebrew word שַׁ֝דַּ֗י, sha-day.

This verse, stated in the form of a rhetorical question, contains the fundamental premiss of Bildad's argument. The twin concepts, judgment (justice; Hebrew: mišpāṭ) and justice (righteousness; Hebrew: tsedeq), are central in describing the Lord's activity in the Hebrew Bible, such as on these two principles 'the earth is established', as is 'God's throne' (Psalm 97:2), also as the two qualities God requires of Israel (Isaiah 5:7; Amos 5:24), and in which the covenant is grounded (Hosea 2:19).

== Bildad's discursive comments and optimistic finish (8:11–22) ==
Bildad's speech (verses 11–19) focuses almost entirely on the negative aspects of the traditional doctrine of retribution, that is, the punishment of the wicked. The excessive and overwhelming details of the discourse seem to force Job to 'understand' that Job's suffering must have been caused by sin. Bildad then concludes his teaching on a fairly positive note (verse 20–22; cf. Psalm 126:2; 132:18), but this 'theoretically optimistic' sense is conditional to Job's repentance on his alleged sin and his turning away from the accusations that God is perverting justice.

=== Verse 22 ===
[Job said:] "Those who hate you will be clothed with shame,

and the dwelling place of the wicked will come to nothing."

- "Will come to nothing": literally, "will not be". This last word (in Hebrew) of Bildad's speech (8:22; ’ê-nen-nū, "will come to nothing") shares the same root as the last word of Job's lament in the previous chapter but with different pronominal suffix (7:21; ’ê-nen-nî, "I [will] no longer [be]").

== See also ==
- Justice
- Punishment
- Righteousness
- Shuah
- Related Bible parts: Genesis 38, Job 6, Job 42

== Sources ==
- Alter, Robert (2010). The Wisdom Books: Job, Proverbs, and Ecclesiastes: A Translation with Commentary. W.W. Norton & Co. ISBN 978-0393080735.
- Coogan, Michael David (2007). Coogan, Michael David; Brettler, Marc Zvi; Newsom, Carol Ann; Perkins, Pheme (eds.). The New Oxford Annotated Bible with the Apocryphal/Deuterocanonical Books: New Revised Standard Version, Issue 48 (Augmented 3rd ed.). Oxford University Press. ISBN 9780195288810.
- Crenshaw, James L. (2007). "17. Job". In Barton, John; Muddiman, John (eds.). The Oxford Bible Commentary (first (paperback) ed.). Oxford University Press. pp. 331–355. ISBN 978-0199277186.
- Estes, Daniel J. (2013). Walton, John H.; Strauss, Mark L. (eds.). Job. Teach the Text Commentary Series. United States: Baker Publishing Group. ISBN 9781441242778.
- Farmer, Kathleen A. (1998). "The Wisdom Books". In McKenzie, Steven L.; Graham, Matt Patrick (eds.). The Hebrew Bible Today: An Introduction to Critical Issues. Westminster John Knox Press. ISBN 978-0-66425652-4.
- Fitzmyer, Joseph A. (2008). A Guide to the Dead Sea Scrolls and Related Literature. Grand Rapids, MI: William B. Eerdmans Publishing Company. ISBN 9780802862419.
- Halley, Henry H. (1965). Halley's Bible Handbook: an abbreviated Bible commentary (24th (revised) ed.). Zondervan Publishing House. ISBN 0-310-25720-4.
- Kugler, Robert; Hartin, Patrick J. (2009). An Introduction to the Bible. Eerdmans. ISBN 978-0-8028-4636-5.
- Ulrich, Eugene, ed. (2010). The Biblical Qumran Scrolls: Transcriptions and Textual Variants. Brill.
- Walton, John H. (2012). Job. United States: Zondervan. ISBN 9780310492009.
- Wilson, Lindsay (2015). Job. United States: Wm. B. Eerdmans Publishing Company. ISBN 9781467443289.
- Würthwein, Ernst (1995). The Text of the Old Testament. Translated by Rhodes, Erroll F. Grand Rapids, MI: Wm. B. Eerdmans. ISBN 0-8028-0788-7.
