= Job 9 =

9th chapter of the Book of Job

- ← chapter 8 chapter 10 →
- The whole Book of Job in the Leningrad Codex (1008 C.E.) from an old facsimile edition.
- Book: Book of Job
- Hebrew Bible part: Ketuvim
- Order in the Hebrew part: 3
- Category: Sifrei Emet
- Christian Bible part: Old Testament
- Order in the Christian part: 18

Job 9 is the ninth chapter of the Book of Job in the Hebrew Bible or the Old Testament of the Christian Bible. The book is anonymous; most scholars believe it was written around 6th century BCE. This chapter records the speech of Job, which belongs to the Dialogue section of the book, comprising Job 3:1–31:40.

== Text ==
The original text is written in Hebrew language. This chapter is divided into 35 verses.

=== Textual witnesses ===
Some early manuscripts containing the text of this chapter in Hebrew are of the Masoretic Text, which includes the Aleppo Codex (10th century), and Codex Leningradensis (1008). Fragments containing parts of this chapter in Hebrew were found among the Dead Sea Scrolls including 4Q100 (4QJob^{b}; 50–1 BCE) with extant verse 27.

There is also a translation into Koine Greek known as the Septuagint, made in the last few centuries BC; some extant ancient manuscripts of this version include Codex Vaticanus (B; $\mathfrak{G}$^{B}; 4th century), Codex Sinaiticus (S; BHK: $\mathfrak{G}$^{S}; 4th century), and Codex Alexandrinus (A; $\mathfrak{G}$^{A}; 5th century).

== Analysis ==
The structure of the book is as follows:

- The Prologue (chapters 1–2)
- The Dialogue (chapters 3–31)
- The Verdicts (32:1–42:6)
- The Epilogue (42:7–17)

Within the structure, chapter 9 is grouped into the Dialogue section with the following outline:

- Job's Self-Curse and Self-Lament (3:1–26)
- Round One (4:1–14:22)
  - Eliphaz (4:1–5:27)
  - Job (6:1–7:21)
  - Bildad (8:1–22)
  - Job (9:1–10:22)
    - Being Righteous before God (9:1–4)
    - God's Power and Force (9:5–13)
    - The Difficulties of Litigation against God (9:14–20)
    - How Does God Rule the World? (9:21–24)
    - Exploring Other Options (9:25–35)
    - Transition to a Lament (10:1–2)
    - Three Sharp Questions (10:3–7)
    - Remember How You Made Me (10:8–12)
    - Now You Have Destroyed Me (10:13–17)
    - Closing Words of Despair (10:18–22)
  - Zophar (11:1–20)
  - Job (12:1–14:22)
- Round Two (15:1–21:34)
- Round Three (22:1–27:23)
- Interlude – A Poem on Wisdom (28:1–28)
- Job's Summing Up (29:1–31:40)

The Dialogue section is composed in the format of poetry with distinctive syntax and grammar.

At this point of the book, the issues of righteousness and justice have been raised by Eliphaz (Job 4–5) and Bildad (Job 8), and Job responded in his first speech (Job 6–7) and now in second speech (Job 9–10). Eliphaz asked whether humans are righteous (יִצְדָּ֑ק, yiṣ-dāq) before God (Job 4:17), but Job points out that it is his righteousness (צִדְקִי, ṣiḏ-qî) that is at stake (Job 6:29). Bildad asked whether God perverts justice (מִשְׁפָּ֑ט, miš-pāṭ) or righteousness (צֶֽדֶק, ṣe-ḏeq; Job 8:3), so in this chapter Job asks how a person can be righteous (יִצְדָּ֑ק, yiṣ-dāq) before God (Job 9:2), which refers back to Eliphaz's question in Job 4:17, but here in the sense of how one can "be in the right" before God, rather than "be declared to be right" by God.

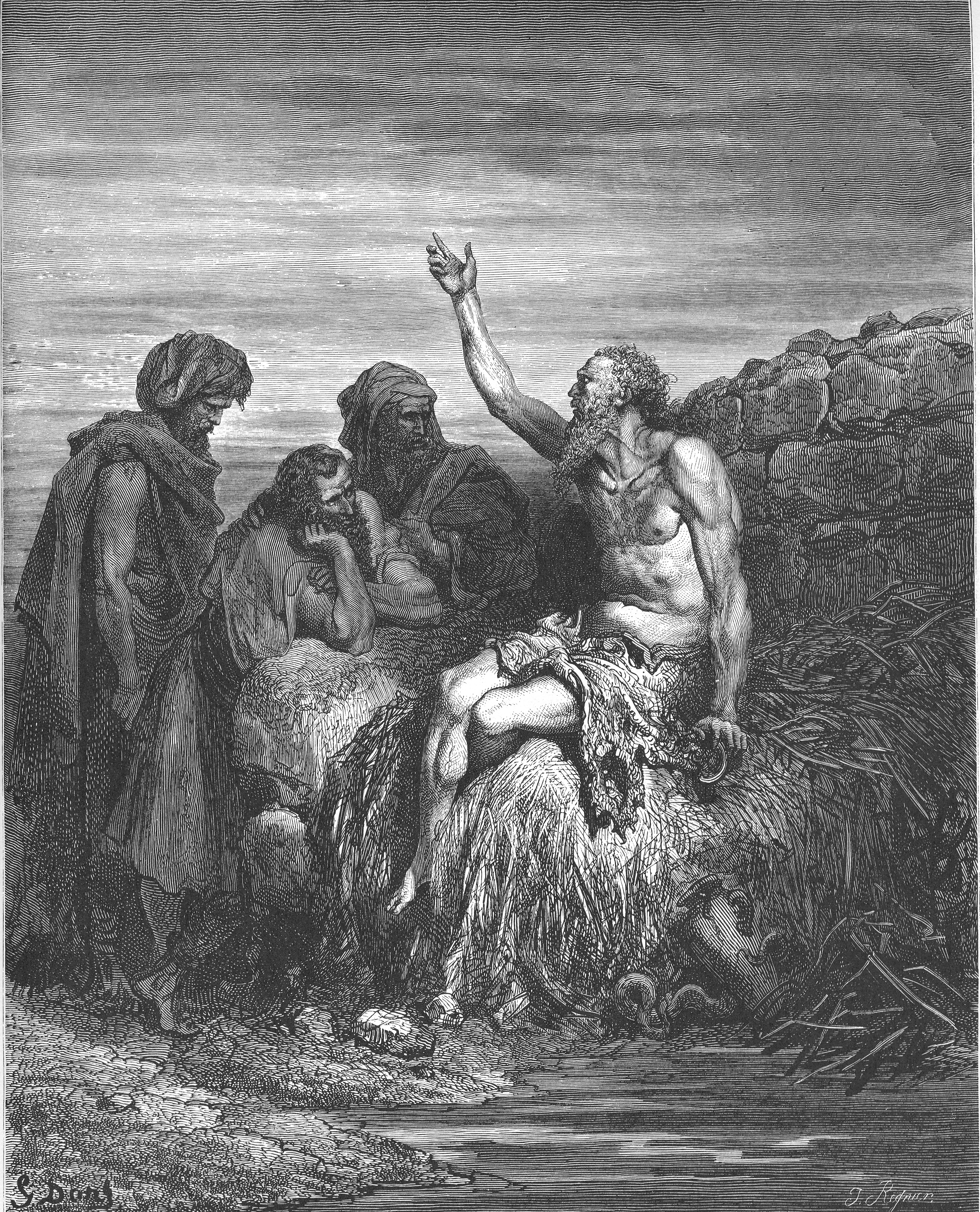
"Job Speaks with His Friends" in Doré's English Bible, by Gustave Doré (1866).

== Job contemplates a litigation against God (9:1–24) ==
As he questions his own righteousness (verse 2), Job contemplates a litigation with God (verse 3), which does not mean to usurp God's authority but rather to establish the truth of Job's righteousness before God (something that God already testified in Job 1:8 and 2:3, but at this time is unknown to Job and his peers), but Job acknowledges the daunting prospect of this litigation in light of God's great power (verses 4–13). Subsequently, Job lays out his case, in a section containing some legal terms (verses 14–20), along with a complaint that being legally right may not be enough to achieve a legal victory against God. In all of his accusations he shares with his peers, Job places high regard to God as the "mighty" Creator (verses 4 and 19), as he tries to clarify to himself how God rules the universe. The attachment to doctrine of retribution makes is difficult for Job to comprehend God's action, especially 'why the blameless and the wicked are not treated differently' (verse 22), while he continues to hold that God is 'in sovereign control of the world' (verse 24).

=== Verse 9 ===
[Job said:] "who made the Bear and Orion,

the Pleiades and the chambers of the south;"

The translation of Bear, Orion, Pleiades from (Hebrew: Ash, Kesil, and Kimah) follows the familiar names of constellations derived from Greek tradition to substitute the Hebrew terms (cf. Job 38:31-33; Amos 5:8).

- "Bear": from Hebrew עָשׁ, ʿash (cf. עַיִשׁ, ʿayish in Job 38:32), rendered as "Arcturus" in KJV, also suggested to be Aldebaran, a star in the constellation of Taurus, among many other suggestions.

== Job explores some options (9:25–35) ==
In this section, Job explores options regarding his contemplated litigation against God:

1. The first option (verses 27–29) is to forget about his complaint, which may lead to condemnation, not vindication (verses 28b–29a).
2. The second option (verses 30–31) is to clean himself up (verse 30), but Job worries that 'God will throw him back into the muck' (verse 31)
3. The third option (verses 32–35) is to call for a mediator, arbiter or umpire (Hebrew: mokiah), which is the option Job really focuses on. It is unclear what kind of third party Job expects, whether it is an actual or a hypothetical figure. Job pursues the possibility of an arbiter again in Job 16:18–22 and 19:23–27.

=== Verses 30–31 ===
[Job said:] ^{30}"If I wash myself with snow

and cleanse my hands with lye,

^{31} yet you will plunge me into a pit,

and my own clothes will abhor me."

- "With snow": translated from the written Hebrew בְמוֹ,v^{e}mo, "(in) snow", whereas it is read as במי־שלג,v^{e}me sheleg, "with water of snow", as supported by the Syriac versions and Targum; here apparently symbolizes "purification" (cf. Psalm 51:9 and Isaiah 1:18. The term sheleg (only appeared for "reading" not in "writing"), also rendered as “soap” (NIV, NRSV, NLT).
- "Lye": from Hebrew בֹּר, bor ("lye", potash"), which has the same meaning as בֹּרִית, borit, the alkali or soda made from the ashes of certain plants used as an ingredient to wash or to make (hands) pure or clean.
- "Pit": rendered based on the pointing in the Masoretic Text (שַּׁ֣חַת, sakhat, also means "ditch"). A change in the pointing of the Hebrew word to שֻׁחוֹת, shukhot, obtains the equivalent of שֻׂחוֹת, sukhot or סֻחוֹת, sukhot, which means "filth" (Isaiah 5:25). M. H. Pope argues that the word "pit" in the Masoretic Text includes the idea of "filth", so an emendation is unnecessary.

== See also ==
- Arcturus
- Big Dipper
- Orion
- Pleiades
- Righteousness
- Ursa Major
- Related Bible parts: Job 4, Job 6, Job 7, Job 38, Job 42, Isaiah 5, Amos 5

== Sources ==
- Alter, Robert (2010). The Wisdom Books: Job, Proverbs, and Ecclesiastes: A Translation with Commentary. W.W. Norton & Co. ISBN 978-0393080735.
- Coogan, Michael David (2007). Coogan, Michael David; Brettler, Marc Zvi; Newsom, Carol Ann; Perkins, Pheme (eds.). The New Oxford Annotated Bible with the Apocryphal/Deuterocanonical Books: New Revised Standard Version, Issue 48 (Augmented 3rd ed.). Oxford University Press. ISBN 9780195288810.
- Crenshaw, James L. (2007). "17. Job". In Barton, John; Muddiman, John (eds.). The Oxford Bible Commentary (first (paperback) ed.). Oxford University Press. pp. 331–355. ISBN 978-0199277186.
- Estes, Daniel J. (2013). Walton, John H.; Strauss, Mark L. (eds.). Job. Teach the Text Commentary Series. United States: Baker Publishing Group. ISBN 9781441242778.
- Farmer, Kathleen A. (1998). "The Wisdom Books". In McKenzie, Steven L.; Graham, Matt Patrick (eds.). The Hebrew Bible Today: An Introduction to Critical Issues. Westminster John Knox Press. ISBN 978-0-66425652-4.
- Fitzmyer, Joseph A. (2008). A Guide to the Dead Sea Scrolls and Related Literature. Grand Rapids, MI: William B. Eerdmans Publishing Company. ISBN 9780802862419.
- Halley, Henry H. (1965). Halley's Bible Handbook: an abbreviated Bible commentary (24th (revised) ed.). Zondervan Publishing House. ISBN 0-310-25720-4.
- Kugler, Robert; Hartin, Patrick J. (2009). An Introduction to the Bible. Eerdmans. ISBN 978-0-8028-4636-5.
- Ulrich, Eugene, ed. (2010). The Biblical Qumran Scrolls: Transcriptions and Textual Variants. Brill.
- Walton, John H. (2012). Job. United States: Zondervan. ISBN 9780310492009.
- Wilson, Lindsay (2015). Job. United States: Wm. B. Eerdmans Publishing Company. ISBN 9781467443289.
- Würthwein, Ernst (1995). The Text of the Old Testament. Translated by Rhodes, Erroll F. Grand Rapids, MI: Wm. B. Eerdmans. ISBN 0-8028-0788-7.
