= Job 11 =

11th chapter of the Book of Job

- ← chapter 10 chapter 12 →
- The whole Book of Job in the Leningrad Codex (1008 C.E.) from an old facsimile edition.
- Book: Book of Job
- Hebrew Bible part: Ketuvim
- Order in the Hebrew part: 3
- Category: Sifrei Emet
- Christian Bible part: Old Testament
- Order in the Christian part: 18

Job 11 is the eleventh chapter of the Book of Job in the Hebrew Bible or the Old Testament of the Christian Bible. The book is anonymous; most scholars believe it was written around 6th century BCE. This chapter records the speech of Zophar the Naamathite (one of Job's friends), which belongs to the Dialogue section of the book, comprising Job 3:1–31:40.

== Text ==
The original text is written in Hebrew language. This chapter is divided into 20 verses.

=== Textual witnesses ===
Some early manuscripts containing the text of this chapter in Hebrew are of the Masoretic Text, which includes the Aleppo Codex (10th century), and Codex Leningradensis (1008).

There is also a translation into Koine Greek known as the Septuagint, made in the last few centuries BC; some extant ancient manuscripts of this version include Codex Vaticanus (B; $\mathfrak{G}$^{B}; 4th century), Codex Sinaiticus (S; BHK: $\mathfrak{G}$^{S}; 4th century), and Codex Alexandrinus (A; $\mathfrak{G}$^{A}; 5th century).

== Analysis ==
The structure of the book is as follows:

- The Prologue (chapters 1–2)
- The Dialogue (chapters 3–31)
- The Verdicts (32:1–42:6)
- The Epilogue (42:7–17)

Within the structure, chapter 11 is grouped into the Dialogue section with the following outline:

- Job's Self-Curse and Self-Lament (3:1–26)
- Round One (4:1–14:22)
  - Eliphaz (4:1–5:27)
  - Job (6:1–7:21)
  - Bildad (8:1–22)
  - Job (9:1–10:22)
  - Zophar (11:1–20)
    - Zophar's Fundamental Position (11:1–6)
    - The Depths of God Are beyond Human Knowing (11:7–12)
    - A Way Forward (11:13–20)
  - Job (12:1–14:22)
- Round Two (15:1–21:34)
- Round Three (22:1–27:23)
- Interlude – A Poem on Wisdom (28:1–28)
- Job's Summing Up (29:1–31:40)

The Dialogue section is composed in the format of poetry with distinctive syntax and grammar.

Chapter 11 starts with an introduction of Zophar, Job's third friend to speak, followed by the exposition of Zophar's fundamental stand (verses 2–6). Zophar argues that human cannot fathom God's depths (verses 7–12), but he believes that reward will come to the repentant righteous (verses 13–20), ended with a warning that the wicked will be destroyed.

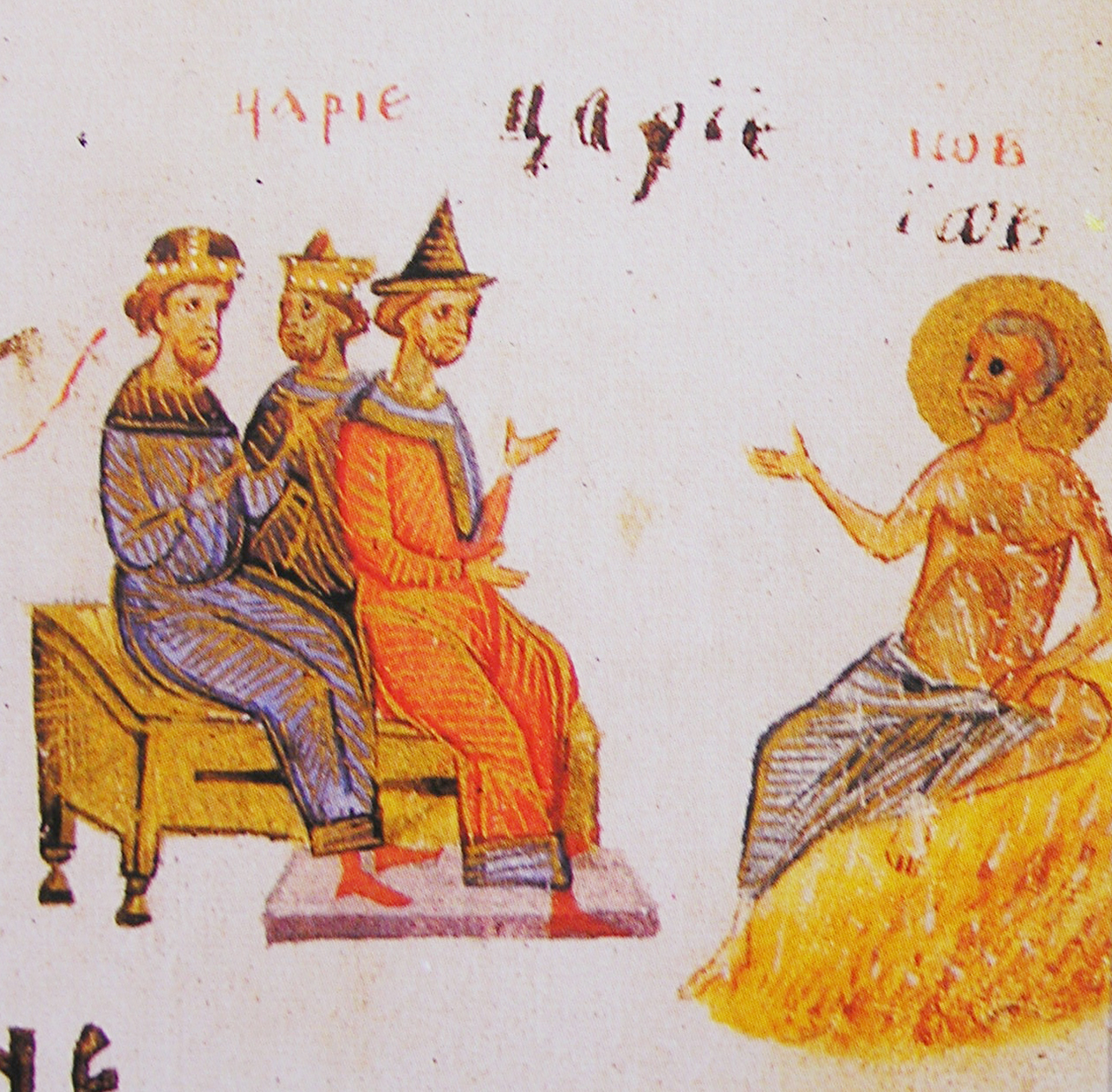
Illustration of Job and his friends from the Kiev Psalter of 1397.

== Zophar's fundamental position (11:1–12) ==
Zophar thinks that Job is a man of full of empty talk and has to be silenced and shamed, because he regards anyone protesting to God is mocking God. Zophar's statements imply that God's wisdom is a secret kept from Job, but not from Zophar, so Zophar can speak on behalf of God (despite without any revelation; verses 5–6). Zophar focuses on God's greatness in creation (like Eliphaz and Bildad at the start of their speeches) to tell Job about the punishment of the wicked, as Zophar perceives Job as a worthless, hollow-minded person in contrast to God's wisdom (verse 12). At the end of the book (Job 42:7–8), it is stated that Zophar is wrongly claiming to speak for God, so Zophar words actually are his own view.

=== Verse 3 ===
[Zophar said:] "“Should your empty talk make men hold their peace?

And when you mock, will no one shame you?"

- "Empty talk": translated from the Hebrew word baddim, which appears six times, always in the plural, in the Hebrew Bible (including in this verse, Job 41:4 (textually questionable), Isaiah 16:6; 44:25; Jeremiah 48:30; 50:26) and can be rendered as "idle talk" or "babble".
- "Hold their peace": or "be silent"; from Hebrew verb in Hiphil form from the stative root חָרַשׁ, kharash ("to be silent/deaf").

== Zophar proposes a way forward (11:13–20) ==
In this section Zophar shows the positive results (verses 15–19) of several conditions (verses 13–14) to gain God's favor, concluded by a warning about the destruction of the wicked (verse 20), based on Zophar's conviction that Job is wicked. Many of Zophar's words ring true, but they don't apply to Job's circumstances (because it is stated in the Prologue, chapters 1 and 2, that Job is blameless in this case). Compared to Eliphaz's thought that Job's suffering can be a temporary setback or Bildad's attempt to distinguish the greater sins of Job's children with Job's sin, Zophar insists that Job is getting off lightly, because of his belief that the degree of sufferings is proportional to one's wickedness.

=== Verse 20 ===
[Zopharsaid:] "But the eyes of the wicked will fail,

and they will not escape,
and their hope will be as the giving up of breath."

- "Will fail": from the Hebrew verb כָּלָה, kalah, which can mean “to fail, cease, fade away”; in this case "the fading of the eyes", that is, "loss of sight", "loss of life’s vitality", also indicating "imminent death".
- "The giving up of breath": or "the breathing out of life". Job stated that 'his days are speeding by without hope' (Job 7:6), and here Zophar rephrases it negatively to conclude his speech (in contrast to more hopeful conclusions of Eliphaz in Job 5:25–26 and Bildad in 8:20–22).

== See also ==
- Evil
- Righteousness
- Sin
- Related Bible parts: Job 9, Job 16, Job 42

== Sources ==
- Alter, Robert (2010). The Wisdom Books: Job, Proverbs, and Ecclesiastes: A Translation with Commentary. W.W. Norton & Co. ISBN 978-0393080735.
- Coogan, Michael David (2007). Coogan, Michael David; Brettler, Marc Zvi; Newsom, Carol Ann; Perkins, Pheme (eds.). The New Oxford Annotated Bible with the Apocryphal/Deuterocanonical Books: New Revised Standard Version, Issue 48 (Augmented 3rd ed.). Oxford University Press. ISBN 9780195288810.
- Crenshaw, James L. (2007). "17. Job". In Barton, John; Muddiman, John (eds.). The Oxford Bible Commentary (first (paperback) ed.). Oxford University Press. pp. 331–355. ISBN 978-0199277186.
- Estes, Daniel J. (2013). Walton, John H.; Strauss, Mark L. (eds.). Job. Teach the Text Commentary Series. United States: Baker Publishing Group. ISBN 9781441242778.
- Farmer, Kathleen A. (1998). "The Wisdom Books". In McKenzie, Steven L.; Graham, Matt Patrick (eds.). The Hebrew Bible Today: An Introduction to Critical Issues. Westminster John Knox Press. ISBN 978-0-66425652-4.
- Halley, Henry H. (1965). Halley's Bible Handbook: an abbreviated Bible commentary (24th (revised) ed.). Zondervan Publishing House. ISBN 0-310-25720-4.
- Kugler, Robert; Hartin, Patrick J. (2009). An Introduction to the Bible. Eerdmans. ISBN 978-0-8028-4636-5.
- Walton, John H. (2012). Job. United States: Zondervan. ISBN 9780310492009.
- Wilson, Lindsay (2015). Job. United States: Wm. B. Eerdmans Publishing Company. ISBN 9781467443289.
- Würthwein, Ernst (1995). The Text of the Old Testament. Translated by Rhodes, Erroll F. Grand Rapids, MI: Wm. B. Eerdmans. ISBN 0-8028-0788-7.
