= Job 10 =

10th chapter of the Book of Job

- ← chapter 9 chapter 11 →
- The whole Book of Job in the Leningrad Codex (1008 C.E.) from an old facsimile edition.
- Book: Book of Job
- Hebrew Bible part: Ketuvim
- Order in the Hebrew part: 3
- Category: Sifrei Emet
- Christian Bible part: Old Testament
- Order in the Christian part: 18

Job 10 is the tenth chapter of the Book of Job in the Hebrew Bible or the Old Testament of the Christian Bible. The book is anonymous; most scholars believe it was written around 6th century BCE. This chapter records the speech of Job, which belongs to the Dialogue section of the book, comprising Job 3:1–31:40.

== Text ==
The original text is written in Hebrew language. This chapter is divided into 22 verses.

=== Textual witnesses ===
Some early manuscripts containing the text of this chapter in Hebrew are of the Masoretic Text, which includes the Aleppo Codex (10th century), and Codex Leningradensis (1008).

There is also a translation into Koine Greek known as the Septuagint, made in the last few centuries BC; some extant ancient manuscripts of this version include Codex Vaticanus (B; $\mathfrak{G}$^{B}; 4th century), Codex Sinaiticus (S; BHK: $\mathfrak{G}$^{S}; 4th century), and Codex Alexandrinus (A; $\mathfrak{G}$^{A}; 5th century).

== Analysis ==
The structure of the book is as follows:

- The Prologue (chapters 1–2)
- The Dialogue (chapters 3–31)
- The Verdicts (32:1–42:6)
- The Epilogue (42:7–17)

Within the structure, chapter 10 is grouped into the Dialogue section with the following outline:

- Job's Self-Curse and Self-Lament (3:1–26)
- Round One (4:1–14:22)
  - Eliphaz (4:1–5:27)
  - Job (6:1–7:21)
  - Bildad (8:1–22)
  - Job (9:1–10:22)
    - Being Righteous before God (9:1–4)
    - God's Power and Force (9:5–13)
    - The Difficulties of Litigation against God (9:14–20)
    - How Does God Rule the World? (9:21–24)
    - Exploring Other Options (9:25–35)
    - Transition to a Lament (10:1–2)
    - Three Sharp Questions (10:3–7)
    - Remember How You Made Me (10:8–12)
    - Now You Have Destroyed Me (10:13–17)
    - Closing Words of Despair (10:18–22)
  - Zophar (11:1–20)
  - Job (12:1–14:22)
- Round Two (15:1–21:34)
- Round Three (22:1–27:23)
- Interlude – A Poem on Wisdom (28:1–28)
- Job's Summing Up (29:1–31:40)

The Dialogue section is composed in the format of poetry with distinctive syntax and grammar.

Chapter 10 has a form of a lament to follow Job's contemplation to get a legal settlement in the previous chapter. The first part (verses 1–7) seems to contain a rehearsing of words to be used for a confrontation with a legal adversary in Job's imaginary litigation, but in general, especially in the second part (verses 8–22), it is primarily a complaint addressed to God.

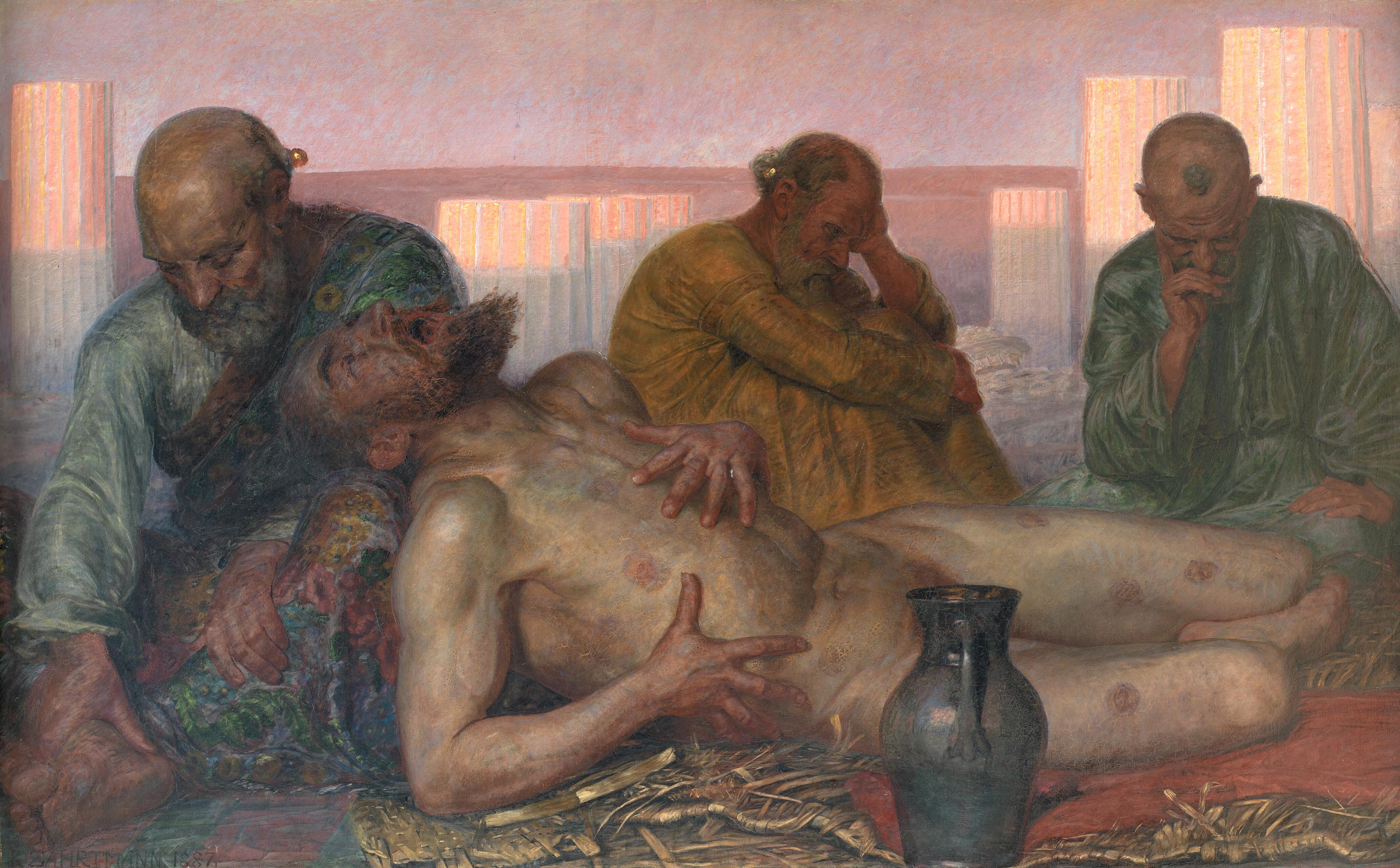
"Job and His Friends", by Kristian Zahrtmann (1887).

== Three sharp questions (10:1–7) ==
The opening of this section (verse 1) is similar to the transitional to the complaint in chapter 7 (Job 7:11), but verse 2 is formed as a request from a defendant that a plaintiff makes known the charge against the defendant. Job then probes God's motive by directly asking 'three sharp rhetorical questions' (verses 3–5).

1. What advantage does God gain from oppressing Job? (verse 3)
2. Does God have the limited human vision (that Job has)? (verse 4)
3. Is God subject to the same time limitation as a human (like Job)? (verse 5)

Job is convinced that God knows Job is not guilty, that is, a "conviction born of his faith", so whereas he contemplated to look for an 'umpire' or arbiter to settle his case (Job 9:32–34), he is now longing for a 'deliverer' (verse 7b).

=== Verse 3 ===
[Job said:] "Is it good for You that You should oppress,

that You should despise the work of Your hands
and smile on the counsel of the wicked?"

- "Is it good for You": can also be rendered as “Does it give you pleasure?” or “Is it profitable for you?” or “Is it fitting for you?”

== Words of despair (10:8–22) ==
Two thoughts about the accusation in verse 3a are stated in verse 8 which will be unpacked in the next parts within the section:

1. Statement in verse 8a concerning the theology of creation is unpacked in verses 9–12
2. Statement in verse 8b accusing the absence of God's providential care is expanded in verses 13–17

The conclusion of Job's second speech recalls his opening outcry (verses 18–19; cf. Job 3:11–26) and his previous plea (verses 20–22; cf. Job 7:19). There are two significant changes to the earlier statements in Job 3:11, 16:

1. The complaint about his tragic birth is now directly addressed to God.
2. The lament about being born is changed to be the lament about being brought out of the womb (verse 18a).

However, acting out of faith, Job does not aim primarily to get relief from his suffering, but to have his relationship with God restored.

=== Verse 8 ===
[Job said:] "Your hands have shaped me and made me completely,

yet You destroy me."

- "Completely": translated from יַ֥חַד סָ֝בִ֗יב, ya-ḥaḏ sā-ḇîḇ, literally "together round about" or "an intricate unity" (NKJV). Most commentators connect this phrase with the second statement, as the Masoretic Text accents indicate (NJPS: “then destroyed every part of me”) and as Septuagint renders.

=== Verse 9 ===
[Job said:] "Remember, I pray, that You have made me like clay.

And will You turn me into dust again?"

- "Into dust": in accordance with Genesis 2:7, that humankind was formed from dust (Hebrew: ߵapar) and will return to dust (3:19; cf. Ecclesiastes 12:7.

=== Verse 18 ===
[Job said:] ^{18}"Why then did You bring me forth out of the womb?

Oh, that I had died, and no eye had seen me!"

- Cross references: Job 1:21; 10:18-19; Jeremiah 20:17-18

The two imperfect verbs in this verse stress 'regrets for something which did not happen'.

== See also ==
- Evil
- Righteousness
- Sin
- Related Bible parts: Job 9, Job 16, Job 42

== Sources ==
- Alter, Robert (2010). The Wisdom Books: Job, Proverbs, and Ecclesiastes: A Translation with Commentary. W.W. Norton & Co. ISBN 978-0393080735.
- Coogan, Michael David (2007). Coogan, Michael David; Brettler, Marc Zvi; Newsom, Carol Ann; Perkins, Pheme (eds.). The New Oxford Annotated Bible with the Apocryphal/Deuterocanonical Books: New Revised Standard Version, Issue 48 (Augmented 3rd ed.). Oxford University Press. ISBN 9780195288810.
- Crenshaw, James L. (2007). "17. Job". In Barton, John; Muddiman, John (eds.). The Oxford Bible Commentary (first (paperback) ed.). Oxford University Press. pp. 331–355. ISBN 978-0199277186.
- Estes, Daniel J. (2013). Walton, John H.; Strauss, Mark L. (eds.). Job. Teach the Text Commentary Series. United States: Baker Publishing Group. ISBN 9781441242778.
- Farmer, Kathleen A. (1998). "The Wisdom Books". In McKenzie, Steven L.; Graham, Matt Patrick (eds.). The Hebrew Bible Today: An Introduction to Critical Issues. Westminster John Knox Press. ISBN 978-0-66425652-4.
- Halley, Henry H. (1965). Halley's Bible Handbook: an abbreviated Bible commentary (24th (revised) ed.). Zondervan Publishing House. ISBN 0-310-25720-4.
- Kugler, Robert; Hartin, Patrick J. (2009). An Introduction to the Bible. Eerdmans. ISBN 978-0-8028-4636-5.
- Walton, John H. (2012). Job. United States: Zondervan. ISBN 9780310492009.
- Wilson, Lindsay (2015). Job. United States: Wm. B. Eerdmans Publishing Company. ISBN 9781467443289.
- Würthwein, Ernst (1995). The Text of the Old Testament. Translated by Rhodes, Erroll F. Grand Rapids, MI: Wm. B. Eerdmans. ISBN 0-8028-0788-7.
