= Job 5 =

5th chapter of the Book of Job

- ← chapter 4 chapter 6 →
- The whole Book of Job in the Leningrad Codex (1008 C.E.) from an old facsimile edition.
- Book: Book of Job
- Hebrew Bible part: Ketuvim
- Order in the Hebrew part: 3
- Category: Sifrei Emet
- Christian Bible part: Old Testament
- Order in the Christian part: 18

Job 5 is the fifth chapter of the Book of Job in the Hebrew Bible or the Old Testament of the Christian Bible. The book is anonymous; most scholars believe it was written around 6th century BCE. This chapter records the speech of Eliphaz the Temanite (one of Job's friends), which belongs to the Dialogue section of the book, comprising Job 3:1–31:40.

== Text ==
The original text is written in Hebrew language. This chapter is divided into 27 verses.

=== Textual witnesses ===
Some early manuscripts containing the text of this chapter in Hebrew are of the Masoretic Text, which includes the Aleppo Codex (10th century), and Codex Leningradensis (1008).

There is also a translation into Koine Greek known as the Septuagint, made in the last few centuries BC; some extant ancient manuscripts of this version include Codex Vaticanus (B; $\mathfrak{G}$^{B}; 4th century), Codex Sinaiticus (S; BHK: $\mathfrak{G}$^{S}; 4th century), and Codex Alexandrinus (A; $\mathfrak{G}$^{A}; 5th century).

== Analysis ==
The structure of the book is as follows:

- The Prologue (chapters 1–2)
- The Dialogue (chapters 3–31)
- The Verdicts (32:1–42:6)
- The Epilogue (42:7–17)

Within the structure, chapter 5 is grouped into the Dialogue section with the following outline:

- Job's Self-Curse and Self-Lament (3:1–26)
- Round One (4:1–14:22)
  - Eliphaz (4:1–5:27)
    - Introduction (4:1-6)
    - A Summary Outline of Retribution (4:7-11)
    - Eliphaz's Vision and Its Implications (4:12-21)
    - The Experience of the Fool (5:1-7)
    - Commit your Cause to God, Who Is Active (5:8-16)
    - God Will Reward the Righteous (5:17-27)
  - Job (6:1–7:21)
  - Bildad (8:1–22)
  - Job (9:1–10:22)
  - Zophar (11:1–20)
  - Job (12:1–14:22)
- Round Two (15:1–21:34)
- Round Three (22:1–27:23)
- Interlude – A Poem on Wisdom (28:1–28)
- Job's Summing Up (29:1–31:40)

The Dialogue section is composed in the format of poetry with distinctive syntax and grammar. The first speech of Eliphaz in chapters 4 and 5 can be broken down into three main sections:

- Job 4:1-11: Eliphaz wonders that Job should fall into such despair, despite having comforted so many people in trouble, and having been so pious, so Eliphaz accuses Job of forgetting the great truth that the righteous never perish under affliction—calamity only destroys the wicked.
- Job 4:12-5:7: Eliphaz tries to warn Job about complaining against God because only the ungodly resent the dealings of God and by their impatience bring down his wrath upon them.
- Job 5:8-27: Eliphaz appeals to Job to follow a different course, to seek after God, for God only smites to heal or to correct, to draw people to himself and away from evil.

== Eliphaz: The experience of the fool (5:1–7) ==
In this section Eliphaz responds directly to Job regarding Job's request for someone to answer him. Eliphaz compared Job's current experiences with those of persons who would be the opposite of the 'wise' (implying that Job is a fool), as these calamities are generally regarded as the fate of the wicked, according to the classical retribution theology.

Eliphaz appeals to the obvious insights encapsulated in proverbial sayings (4:8, 'those who plough iniquity and sow trouble reap the same'; 5:2, 'Surely vexation kills the fool, and jealousy slays the simple').

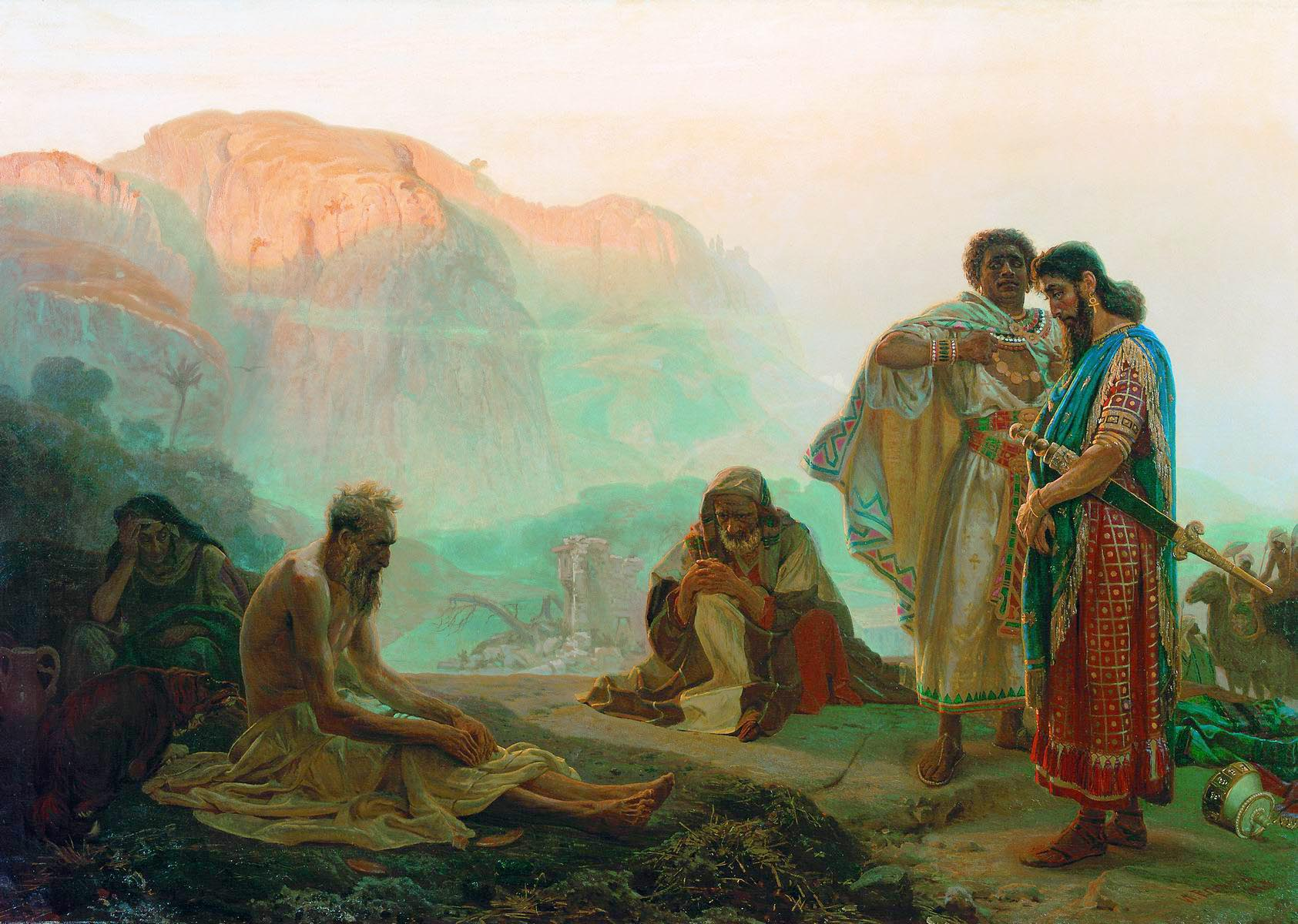
Job and his friends

=== Verse 1 ===
[Eliphaz said:] "Call out now;

Is there anyone who will answer you?
And to which of the holy ones will you turn?"

- "Holy ones": is rendered in Greek Septuagint as 'holy angels' (cf. Job 1:6; 2:1; 4:18).

Job later responds that he desires for 'such a mediator to present his case before God' (Job 9:33; 16:19–21).

== Eliphaz suggests to commit one's cause to God who will reward the righteous (5:8–27) ==
This section can be divided into parts comprising verses 8–16, verses 17–26 and verse 27 as the conclusion of Eliphaz's first speech. Verse 8 starts a new topic with a 'strong adversative' "As for me" (or "But I") to commend a solution that Job "put his matter" (or "commit his cause") to God. Ironically, in the whole book, only Job who does talk to God, whereas all others restrict to 'pontificating about God'. The last statement for this first part (verse 16) emphasizes again the negative aspect of the retributive justice with 'a declaration that injustice has shut its mouth'. The next part (verses 17–26) deals with God acting in 'reproving' and 'disciplining', emphasizing the positive aspect of the doctrine of retribution, that the righteous will be rewarded. Eliphaz suggests that 'Job's only task was to apply the traditional teachings to himself, not to persist in his protest' (verse 27); it is the climax to Eliphaz's first speech.

=== Verse 17 ===
[Eliphaz said:] “Behold, blessed is the one whom God reproves;

therefore despise not the discipline of the Almighty.

- "Blessed is the one": a standard wisdom phrase that is used, among others, in Psalm 1:1.
- "Almighty": translated from the word "Shaddai"; this is the first of 31 occurrences in the Book of Job.

Despite his vision in Job 4:17, Eliphaz presents a faulty opinion in 5:17 about the disciplinary view of suffering (which will later be corrected by Elihu), because Job's suffering is not due to God's discipline.

== See also ==
- Discipline
- Divine Providence
- Related Bible parts: Job 3, Job 42, Psalm 1

== Sources ==
- Alter, Robert (2010). The Wisdom Books: Job, Proverbs, and Ecclesiastes: A Translation with Commentary. W.W. Norton & Co. ISBN 978-0393080735.
- Coogan, Michael David (2007). Coogan, Michael David; Brettler, Marc Zvi; Newsom, Carol Ann; Perkins, Pheme (eds.). The New Oxford Annotated Bible with the Apocryphal/Deuterocanonical Books: New Revised Standard Version, Issue 48 (Augmented 3rd ed.). Oxford University Press. ISBN 9780195288810.
- Crenshaw, James L. (2007). "17. Job". In Barton, John; Muddiman, John (eds.). The Oxford Bible Commentary (first (paperback) ed.). Oxford University Press. pp. 331–355. ISBN 978-0199277186.
- Estes, Daniel J. (2013). Walton, John H.; Strauss, Mark L. (eds.). Job. Teach the Text Commentary Series. United States: Baker Publishing Group. ISBN 9781441242778.
- Farmer, Kathleen A. (1998). "The Wisdom Books". In McKenzie, Steven L.; Graham, Matt Patrick (eds.). The Hebrew Bible Today: An Introduction to Critical Issues. Westminster John Knox Press. ISBN 978-0-66425652-4.
- Halley, Henry H. (1965). Halley's Bible Handbook: an abbreviated Bible commentary (24th (revised) ed.). Zondervan Publishing House. ISBN 0-310-25720-4.
- Kugler, Robert; Hartin, Patrick J. (2009). An Introduction to the Bible. Eerdmans. ISBN 978-0-8028-4636-5.
- Walton, John H. (2012). Job. United States: Zondervan. ISBN 9780310492009.
- Wilson, Lindsay (2015). Job. United States: Wm. B. Eerdmans Publishing Company. ISBN 9781467443289.
- Würthwein, Ernst (1995). The Text of the Old Testament. Translated by Rhodes, Erroll F. Grand Rapids, MI: Wm. B. Eerdmans. ISBN 0-8028-0788-7.
