= Job 6 =

6th chapter of the Book of Job

- ← chapter 5 chapter 7 →
- The whole Book of Job in the Leningrad Codex (1008 C.E.) from an old facsimile edition.
- Book: Book of Job
- Hebrew Bible part: Ketuvim
- Order in the Hebrew part: 3
- Category: Sifrei Emet
- Christian Bible part: Old Testament
- Order in the Christian part: 18

Job 6 is the sixth chapter of the Book of Job in the Hebrew Bible or the Old Testament of the Christian Bible. The book is anonymous; most scholars believe it was written around 6th century BCE. This chapter records the speech of Job, which belongs to the Dialogue section of the book, comprising Job 3:1–31:40.

== Text ==
The original text is written in Hebrew language. This chapter is divided into 27 verses.

=== Textual witnesses ===
Some early manuscripts containing the text of this chapter in Hebrew are of the Masoretic Text, which includes the Aleppo Codex (10th century), and Codex Leningradensis (1008).

There is also a translation into Koine Greek known as the Septuagint, made in the last few centuries BC; some extant ancient manuscripts of this version include Codex Vaticanus (B; $\mathfrak{G}$^{B}; 4th century), Codex Sinaiticus (S; BHK: $\mathfrak{G}$^{S}; 4th century), and Codex Alexandrinus (A; $\mathfrak{G}$^{A}; 5th century).

== Analysis ==
The structure of the book is as follows:

- The Prologue (chapters 1–2)
- The Dialogue (chapters 3–31)
- The Verdicts (32:1–42:6)
- The Epilogue (42:7–17)

Within the structure, chapter 6 is grouped into the Dialogue section with the following outline:

- Job's Self-Curse and Self-Lament (3:1–26)
- Round One (4:1–14:22)
  - Eliphaz (4:1–5:27)
  - Job (6:1–7:21)
    - Job to Friends (6:1–30)
      - Job's Complaint Outlined (6:1–7)
      - Job's Request (6:8–13)
      - The Friends' Failure to Care (6:14–23)
      - A Challenge to the Friends (6:24–30)
    - Job to God (7:1–21)
      - The Hardship of Human Life (7:1–8)
      - The Short–Lived Nature of Human Life (7:9–16)
      - Why? How Long? (7:17–21)
  - Bildad (8:1–22)
  - Job (9:1–10:22)
  - Zophar (11:1–20)
  - Job (12:1–14:22)
- Round Two (15:1–21:34)
- Round Three (22:1–27:23)
- Interlude – A Poem on Wisdom (28:1–28)
- Job's Summing Up (29:1–31:40)

The Dialogue section is composed in the format of poetry with distinctive syntax and grammar. Chapters 6 and 7 record Job's response after the first speech of Eliphaz (in chapters 4 and 5), which can be divided into two main sections:

- Job 6: Job answers Eliphaz's misdirected words.
- Job 7: Job addresses God.

The pattern of first speaking to the friends and then turning to God is typical of Job throughout the dialogue.

In chapter 6, the introduction (verse 1) and a sketch or outline of Job's s complaint (verses 2–7) is followed by Job's Request (verses 8–13) and his rebuke of the friends' failure to care for him (verses 14–23), then concluded with a challenge addressed to the friends (verses 24–30). The main purpose of chapter 6 is "to point out that the friend's explanation of Job's current plight in the light of tradition is insensitive and amounts to deception'.

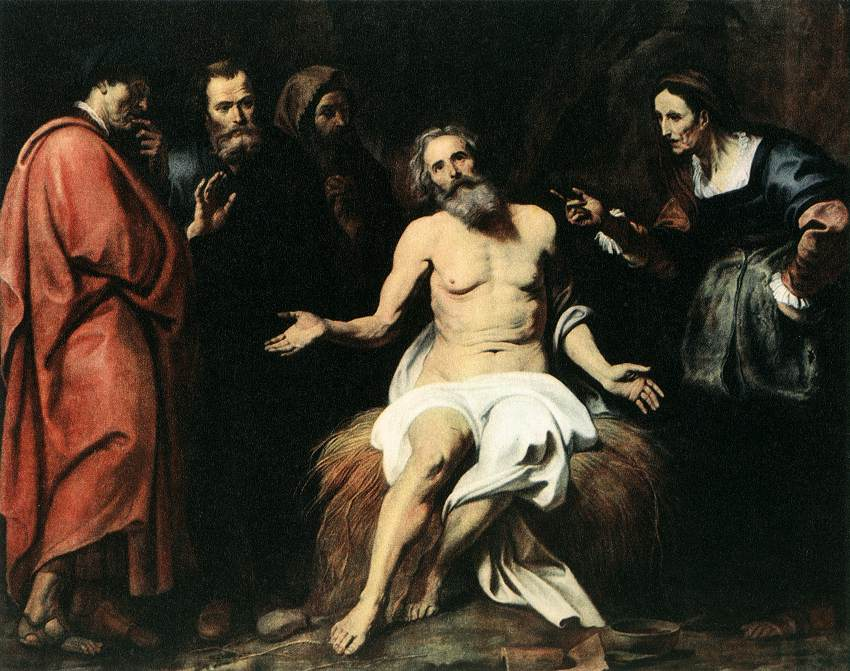
"The Patient Job", by Gerard Seghers (1591–1651).

== Job's outline of complaints and requests (6:1–13) ==
Job's response (from the verb in verse 1) might not necessarily answer every matter raised by Eliphaz. First, Job requests that his 'angst and suffering' be taken seriously, that is, both be properly weighed (an intensive expression) together to demonstrate its excessiveness against what is right (verses 2–3); fitting with the call for vindication in verse 29. Secondly, with the metaphors of arrows aiming to him and the description of donkeys and oxen to be fed (verses 4–6), Job believes that God is in total control, even as Job is still crying out for answer. Lastly, Job seems to view Eliphaz's words bland, tasteless, and missed the point of Job's anguish, like "tasteless food without salt" (verse 7). In verses 8–13 Job states to his friends that he longs for God to finish his life, but in his petition he keeps his faith that God is the one in control; Job does not reduce the size of God's power nor deny God and His words.

=== Verses 2–3 ===
[Job said:] ^{2}"Oh that my grief were throughly weighed, and my calamity laid in the balances together!

^{3}For now it would be heavier than the sand of the sea: therefore my words are swallowed up."

- "Oh": translated from Hebrew conjunction לוּ, lu (can also be rendered as "if, if only"), which signifies 'an unrealizable wish', with the Niphal imperfect.
- "Grief": is translated from Hebrew word "ka'as", which has the sense of "anguish, vexation or despair", a term that is also used in Psalm 6:7; 10:14; Proverbs 12:16. It is used as a warning by Eliphaz in Job 5:2 that "ka'as kills the fool", but Job uses it here to contend that his ka'as compels his to speak impetuously (verse 3).
- "Swallowed up": translated from the Hebrew verb לָעוּ, laʿu which is assumed to be taken from a geminate root meaning "to suck" or "to swallow" (cf. KJV), but can also traced to a root לָעָה, laʿah, cognate to an Arabic root meaning "to chatter", which in modern Hebrew has a meaning of "to stammer out", so when applied in this verse in some English version it is rendered in the sense of "speaking wildly, rashly, or charged with grief".

== Job rebukes and challenges his friends (6:14–30) ==
In this section Job criticizes his friends whom he hopes to get support from but they failed to do so. Job alludes to Eliphaz's words to let the fear of God be Job's ground of confidence (Job 4:6) and turns in around by saying that Eliphaz's speech is actually abandoning the fear of God. In verse 21, Job addresses all friends (using the plural word for "you", although until now only Eliphaz has spoken) that they have seen his situation and are afraid – perhaps afraid that it might also happen to them or that it would challenge their core belief in retribution. Therefore, Job challenges them to teach or correct him, if they can, by giving him explanation, not condemnation (verses 24–30). Job maintains to be a person of integrity and asks his friends twice to "turn" ("repent" or "change in direction") or reconsider their thought process. Verse 30 contains two rhetorical questions that answer "no" to the issue raised by the Adversary in Job 1:9 whether Job would fear God for nothing or Job's faith is based on self-interest.

=== Verse 30 ===
[Job said:] "Is there iniquity in my tongue?

cannot my taste discern perverse things?"

- "Iniquity": translated from the Hebrew word עַוְלָה, ʿavlah, which is repeated from the last verse; used here to be a fitting transition to chapter 7 as Job cries again in despair for his cruel fate despite his innocence.
- "Taste": or literally in Hebrew, "palate", not so much for the organ of speech (by metonymy), but more of discernment – to indicate what one thinks.
- "Perverse things": translated from the Hebrew word הַוּוֹת, havvot, which can be rendered as "calamities", but can also be understood in the parallelism to “wickedness” of words

== See also ==
- Shaddai
- Sheba
- Tema
- Related Bible parts: Job 1, Job 4

== Sources ==
- Alter, Robert (2010). The Wisdom Books: Job, Proverbs, and Ecclesiastes: A Translation with Commentary. W.W. Norton & Co. ISBN 978-0393080735.
- Coogan, Michael David (2007). Coogan, Michael David; Brettler, Marc Zvi; Newsom, Carol Ann; Perkins, Pheme (eds.). The New Oxford Annotated Bible with the Apocryphal/Deuterocanonical Books: New Revised Standard Version, Issue 48 (Augmented 3rd ed.). Oxford University Press. ISBN 9780195288810.
- Crenshaw, James L. (2007). "17. Job". In Barton, John; Muddiman, John (eds.). The Oxford Bible Commentary (first (paperback) ed.). Oxford University Press. pp. 331–355. ISBN 978-0199277186.
- Estes, Daniel J. (2013). Walton, John H.; Strauss, Mark L. (eds.). Job. Teach the Text Commentary Series. United States: Baker Publishing Group. ISBN 9781441242778.
- Farmer, Kathleen A. (1998). "The Wisdom Books". In McKenzie, Steven L.; Graham, Matt Patrick (eds.). The Hebrew Bible Today: An Introduction to Critical Issues. Westminster John Knox Press. ISBN 978-0-66425652-4.
- Halley, Henry H. (1965). Halley's Bible Handbook: an abbreviated Bible commentary (24th (revised) ed.). Zondervan Publishing House. ISBN 0-310-25720-4.
- Kugler, Robert; Hartin, Patrick J. (2009). An Introduction to the Bible. Eerdmans. ISBN 978-0-8028-4636-5.
- Walton, John H. (2012). Job. United States: Zondervan. ISBN 9780310492009.
- Wilson, Lindsay (2015). Job. United States: Wm. B. Eerdmans Publishing Company. ISBN 9781467443289.
- Würthwein, Ernst (1995). The Text of the Old Testament. Translated by Rhodes, Erroll F. Grand Rapids, MI: Wm. B. Eerdmans. ISBN 0-8028-0788-7.
