= Job 7 =

7th chapter of the Book of Job

- ← chapter 6 chapter 8 →
- The whole Book of Job in the Leningrad Codex (1008 C.E.) from an old facsimile edition.
- Book: Book of Job
- Hebrew Bible part: Ketuvim
- Order in the Hebrew part: 3
- Category: Sifrei Emet
- Christian Bible part: Old Testament
- Order in the Christian part: 18

Job 7 is the seventh chapter of the Book of Job in the Hebrew Bible or the Old Testament of the Christian Bible. The book is anonymous; most scholars believe it was written around 6th century BCE. The "dialogue" section of the book, comprises Job 3:1–31:40. This chapter records one of the speeches of Job, the central character in the book.

== Text ==
The original text is written in Hebrew language. This chapter is divided into 21 verses. Some early manuscripts containing the text of this chapter in Hebrew are of the Masoretic Text, which includes the Aleppo Codex (10th century), and Codex Leningradensis (1008).

There is also a translation into Koine Greek known as the Septuagint, made in the last few centuries BC; some extant ancient manuscripts of this version include Codex Vaticanus (B; $\mathfrak{G}$^{B}; 4th century), Codex Sinaiticus (S; BHK: $\mathfrak{G}$^{S}; 4th century), and Codex Alexandrinus (A; $\mathfrak{G}$^{A}; 5th century).

== Analysis ==
The structure of the book is as follows:

- The Prologue (chapters 1–2)
- The Dialogue (chapters 3–31)
- The Verdicts (32:1–42:6)
- The Epilogue (42:7–17)

Within the structure, chapter 7 is grouped into the Dialogue section with the following outline:

- Job's Self-Curse and Self-Lament (3:1–26)
- Round One (4:1–14:22)
  - Eliphaz (4:1–5:27)
  - Job (6:1–7:21)
    - Job to Friends (6:1–30)
      - Job's Complaint Outlined (6:1–7)
      - Job's Request (6:8–13)
      - The Friends' Failure to Care (6:14–23)
      - A Challenge to the Friends (6:24–30)
    - Job to God (7:1–21)
      - The Hardship of Human Life (7:1–8)
      - The Short–Lived Nature of Human Life (7:9–16)
      - Why? How Long? (7:17–21)
  - Bildad (8:1–22)
  - Job (9:1–10:22)
  - Zophar (11:1–20)
  - Job (12:1–14:22)
- Round Two (15:1–21:34)
- Round Three (22:1–27:23)
- Interlude – A Poem on Wisdom (28:1–28)
- Job's Summing Up (29:1–31:40)

The Dialogue section is composed in the format of poetry with distinctive syntax and grammar. Chapters 6 and 7 record Job's response after the first speech of Eliphaz (in chapters 4 and 5), which can be divided into two main sections:

- Job 6: Job answers Eliphaz's misdirected words.
- Job 7: Job addresses God.

The pattern of first speaking to the friends and then turning to God is typical of Job throughout the dialogue.

Chapter 7 is 'a balanced poem' comprising 3 parts, each bracketed by an opening statement about human condition and a closing cry to God:

Part#	Verses	Opening	Closing
1	1–8	1–2	7–8
2	9–16	9–10	15–16
3	17–21	17–18	21

The change of the focus of Job's speech is made explicit in verses 7–8, so the "you" in verses 12, 14, 16 and 21 is clearly referring to YHWH.

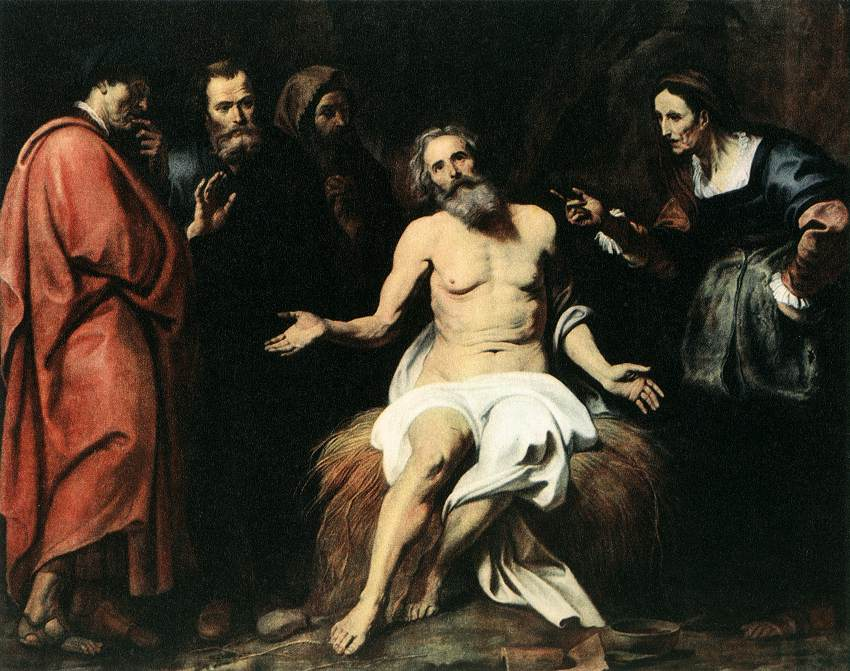
"The Patient Job", by Gerard Seghers (1591–1651).

== The hardship of human life (7:1–8) ==
In this part, Job speaks of human misery and hardship in human existence. Job mentions the brevity of life (the focus later, in chapter 14) and the lack of hope (verse 6) before addressing God directly (verse 7) calling God to act toward him ("remember") according to God's prior commitments to "the afflicted" (cf. Genesis 8:1; Exodus 2:24). In rejecting Eliphaz's optimistic view that hope remains for him (cf. Job 6:20), Job utilizes a pun on the Hebrew words for "hope" and "thread" (tiqwah) as he thinks of himself as fragile and precarious as the useless 'small ends of the thread that are snapped off a loom after the weaving is completed' (cf. Joshua 2:18. 21).

=== Verse 7 ===
[Job said:] "Remember that my life is a breath;

my eye will never again see good."

- "Remember": This is apparently directed to God, as is clear from verse 11 on, because God is the one who breathed breath into man's nostrils (Genesis 2:7), so God is called to remember that man's life (חַי, ḥay, also "age", "alive", "living") is but a breath (רוּחַ, rū-aḥ; also "spirit", "wind").

== The short-lived nature of human life (7:9–16) ==
Job's second axiom of human life focuses on 'the ephemeral nature of human beings'. In weighing up death and life (verses 15–16) Job does not embrace 'death as something positive', but he only dismisses the 'possibility of living forever'.

=== Verse 12 ===
[Job said:] "Am I the sea, or a sea monster,

that You set a guard over me?"

- "The sea or a sea monster": translated from two Hebrew word הֲ‍ֽיָם, hă-yām (literally "the sea"), and תַּנִּ֑ין, tan-nîn "sea serpent"; also "whale" or mythological "dragon" or "monster of the deep". Both words seem to echo the Canaanite myth of chaotic forces that are ultimately defeated by Baal, in which tale the enemy is also called "Mot", the same word as the Hebrew term for "death" (mot or mawet; cf. Job 7:15). "The sea" symbolizes 'the tumultuous elements of creation', whereas the creatures in the sea symbolize 'the powerful forces of chaos—Leviathan, Tannin, and Rahab', which would require special attention to handle.

== Questions of why? and how long? (7:17–21) ==
The third part contains a barrage of questions: "why?" (verses 17–18) and then "how long?" (verse 19), which are the characteristics of laments. Job does not deny that he sins (verse 20–21) but he cannot understand why he has not been forgiven after showing penitence and making necessary sacrifices (cf. Job 1:13). At the end, there is a tension between Job desiring God's presence and God's absence in his life.

=== Verse 21 ===
[Job said:] "And why do You not pardon my transgression

and take away my iniquity?

For now I will lie down in the dust;

and You will seek me diligently, but I will not be."

- "For now I will lie down in the dust": rendered in the Greek Septuagint as "for now I will depart to the earth.”

The last word of Job's speech (7:21; ’ê-nen-nî, "I [will] no longer [be]") shares the same root as the last word in Bildad's speech in the following chapter with different pronominal suffix (8:22; ’ê-nen-nū, "will come to nothing").

== See also ==
- Boil
- Nightmare
- Sheol
- Sin
- Related Bible parts: Genesis 1, Genesis 2, Job 1, Job 6

== Sources ==
- Alter, Robert (2010). The Wisdom Books: Job, Proverbs, and Ecclesiastes: A Translation with Commentary. W.W. Norton & Co. ISBN 978-0393080735.
- Coogan, Michael David (2007). Coogan, Michael David; Brettler, Marc Zvi; Newsom, Carol Ann; Perkins, Pheme (eds.). The New Oxford Annotated Bible with the Apocryphal/Deuterocanonical Books: New Revised Standard Version, Issue 48 (Augmented 3rd ed.). Oxford University Press. ISBN 9780195288810.
- Crenshaw, James L. (2007). "17. Job". In Barton, John; Muddiman, John (eds.). The Oxford Bible Commentary (first (paperback) ed.). Oxford University Press. pp. 331–355. ISBN 978-0199277186.
- Estes, Daniel J. (2013). Walton, John H.; Strauss, Mark L. (eds.). Job. Teach the Text Commentary Series. United States: Baker Publishing Group. ISBN 9781441242778.
- Farmer, Kathleen A. (1998). "The Wisdom Books". In McKenzie, Steven L.; Graham, Matt Patrick (eds.). The Hebrew Bible Today: An Introduction to Critical Issues. Westminster John Knox Press. ISBN 978-0-66425652-4.
- Halley, Henry H. (1965). Halley's Bible Handbook: an abbreviated Bible commentary (24th (revised) ed.). Zondervan Publishing House. ISBN 0-310-25720-4.
- Kugler, Robert; Hartin, Patrick J. (2009). An Introduction to the Bible. Eerdmans. ISBN 978-0-8028-4636-5.
- Walton, John H. (2012). Job. United States: Zondervan. ISBN 9780310492009.
- Wilson, Lindsay (2015). Job. United States: Wm. B. Eerdmans Publishing Company. ISBN 9781467443289.
- Würthwein, Ernst (1995). The Text of the Old Testament. Translated by Rhodes, Erroll F. Grand Rapids, MI: Wm. B. Eerdmans. ISBN 0-8028-0788-7.
