= Job 4 =

4th chapter of the Book of Job

- ← chapter 3 chapter 5 →
- The whole Book of Job in the Leningrad Codex (1008 C.E.) from an old facsimile edition.
- Book: Book of Job
- Hebrew Bible part: Ketuvim
- Order in the Hebrew part: 3
- Category: Sifrei Emet
- Christian Bible part: Old Testament
- Order in the Christian part: 18

Job 4 is the fourth chapter of the Book of Job in the Hebrew Bible or the Old Testament of the Christian Bible. The book is anonymous; most scholars believe it was written around 6th century BCE. This chapter records the speech of Eliphaz the Temanite (one of Job's friends), which belongs to the Dialogue section of the book, comprising Job 3:1–31:40.

== Text ==
The original text is written in Hebrew language. This chapter is divided into 21 verses.

=== Textual witnesses ===
Some early manuscripts containing the text of this chapter in Hebrew are of the Masoretic Text, which includes the Aleppo Codex (10th century), and Codex Leningradensis (1008).

There is also a translation into Koine Greek known as the Septuagint, made in the last few centuries BC; some extant ancient manuscripts of this version include Codex Vaticanus (B; $\mathfrak{G}$^{B}; 4th century), Codex Sinaiticus (S; BHK: $\mathfrak{G}$^{S}; 4th century), and Codex Alexandrinus (A; $\mathfrak{G}$^{A}; 5th century).

== Analysis ==
The structure of the book is as follows:

- The Prologue (chapters 1–2)
- The Dialogue (chapters 3–31)
- The Verdicts (32:1–42:6)
- The Epilogue (42:7–17)

Within the structure, chapter 4 is grouped into the Dialogue section with the following outline:

- Job's Self-Curse and Self-Lament (3:1–26)
- Round One (4:1–14:22)
  - Eliphaz (4:1–5:27)
    - Introduction (4:1-6)
    - A Summary Outline of Retribution (4:7-11)
    - Eliphaz's Vision and Its Implications (4:12-21)
    - The Experience of the Fool (5:1-7)
    - Commit your Cause to God, Who Is Active (5:8-16)
    - God Will Reward the Righteous (5:17-27)
  - Job (6:1–7:21)
  - Bildad (8:1–22)
  - Job (9:1–10:22)
  - Zophar (11:1–20)
  - Job (12:1–14:22)
- Round Two (15:1–21:34)
- Round Three (22:1–27:23)
- Interlude – A Poem on Wisdom (28:1–28)
- Job's Summing Up (29:1–31:40)

The Dialogue section is composed in the format of poetry with distinctive syntax and grammar. The first speech of Eliphaz in chapters 4 and 5 can be broken down into three main sections:

- Job 4:1-11: Eliphaz wonders that Job should fall into such despair, despite having comforted so many people in trouble, and having been so pious, so Eliphaz accuses Job of forgetting the great truth that the righteous never perish under affliction—calamity only destroys the wicked.
- Job 4:12-5:7: Eliphaz tries to warn Job about complaining against God because only the ungodly resent the dealings of God and by their impatience bring down his wrath upon them.
- Job 5:8-27: Eliphaz appeals to Job to follow a different course, to seek after God, for God only smites to heal or to correct, to draw people to himself and away from evil.

== Eliphaz's summary outline of retribution (4:1–11) ==
This section can be divided into two parts: an introduction (verses 1–6) followed by an outline of the retribution by Eliphaz (verses 7–11). Twice in the beginning of his speech Eliphaz starts off in a respectful way to Job (verse 2a; verses 3–4) before using "but" to speak what he really wants to say: that Job should apply the advices he himself had given to others and using a godly manner to gain consolation. Eliphaz sets forth the arguments that will be explored in the debate, such as:

- "You can trust in God to restore you" (using two words 'blameless' and a 'God-fearer', Job 1:1, 8; 2:3, that characterized Job)
- "Wickedness is punished"
- "Human beings are naturally culpable"
- "The prosperity of the sinful will be cut short"
- "The best course is to seek God"
- "Suffering is an indication of divine discipline"

Eliphaz appeals to consensus (4:7), that he expects Job to 'concur in the common dogma of retribution', as well as appeals to individual experience (4:8, 'As I have seen'), to special revelation (4:12-21), to collective experience (5:27a, 'See, we have searched this out; it is true'), and to the obvious insights encapsulated in proverbial sayings (4:8, 'those who plough iniquity and sow trouble reap the same'; 5:2, 'Surely vexation kills the fool, and jealousy slays the simple'). Convinced that a principle of reward and punishment governed the universe, Eliphaz is oblivious to the pain resulting from this dogma (4:7–9, where a divine wind brings destruction like the tempest that killed Job's children).

The poem contains rich vocabulary, such as the use five different words for lion in 4:10–11 (cf. Joel 1:4 for similar richness), which metaphorically might allude to the death of Job's children.

=== Verse 1 ===
Then Eliphaz the Temanite answered and said,

- "Eliphaz": from Hebrew: אֱלִיפָז, ’Ělīp̄āz, "El is pure gold" (alternatively, "My God is separate" or "My God is remote"), is mentioned first among Job's visitors (Job 2:11), and the first to respond to Job's words, so he is regarded as the oldest.
- "Temanite": that is, coming from Teman, an important city of Edom (Amos 1:12; Obadiah 1:8). Based on the place location, Eliphaz is assumed to represent the wisdom of the Edomites, which, according to Obadiah 1:8, Jeremiah 49:7, and Baruch 3:22, was famous in antiquity.

=== Verse 10–11 ===
[Eliphaz said:] ^{10}The roaring of the lion, and the voice of the fierce lion,

and the teeth of the young lions are broken.

^{11}The old lion perishes for lack of prey,

and the cubs of the lioness are scattered

- "Lion": in these verses five occurrences, including the addition of English adjectives, are translated from five different Hebrew words:
  - אַ֭רְיֵה, ’ar-yêh (in "the roaring of [the lion]"; singular) This is the generic term for “lion.”
  - שָׁ֑חַל, šā-ḥal (in "the voice of [the fierce lion]"; singular)
  - כְפִירִ֣ים, ḵə-p̄î-rîm (in "the teeth of [the young lions"]; plural)
  - לַ֭יִשׁ, la-yiš (in "[the old lion] perishes"; singular) This word is traditionally rendered "strong lion," occurs only three times in the Hebrew Bible (Job 4:11, Proverbs 30:30 and Isaiah 30:6, but has cognates in several of the Semitic languages to indicate 'lion as king of the beasts'.
  - לָ֝בִ֗יא, lā-ḇî (in "the cubs of [the lioness]"; singular)

D. J. A. Clines thinks that it is 'probably impossible to distinguish' the meaning of these words.

The Greek Septuagint renders verse 10 as “the strength of the lion, and the voice of the lioness and the exulting cry of serpents are quenched.”

== Eliphaz's vision (4:12–21) ==
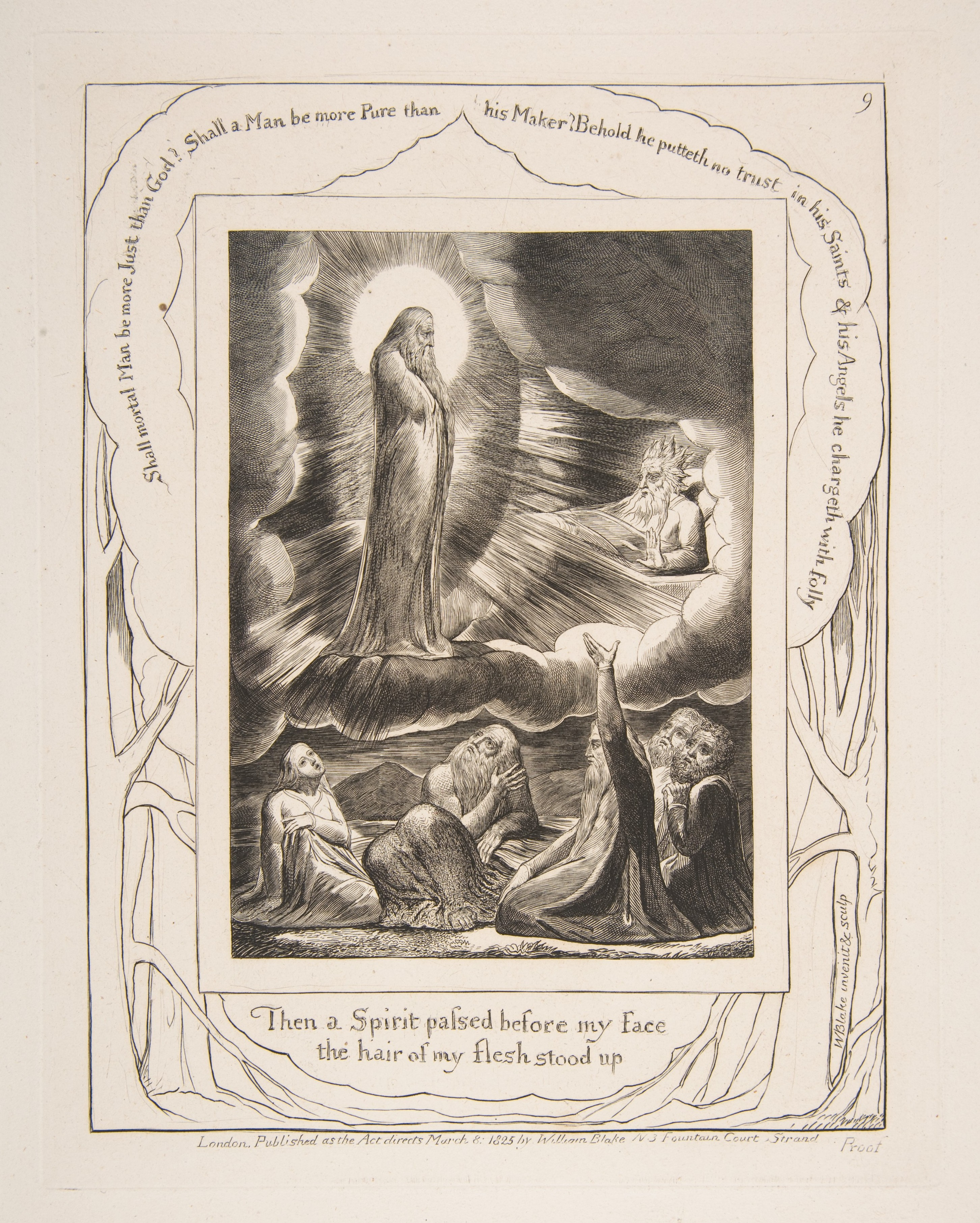
"The Vision of Eliphaz", from Illustrations of the Book of Job, by William Blake (c. 1825–1826).

In this section Eliphaz shares the divine visitation he received while in a deep sleep (tardēmâ; cf. Abraham in Genesis 15:12–17), when he felt a wind (rûah) glided past his face, but could not make out the exact appearance of the deity, only could 'grasp the brief word that follows an eerie silence': 'Can a mortal be more righteous than God (Eloah)?' (verses 12–17). Eliphaz then draws the implications of this in 'a series of reflection on human condition', implicitly on 'Job and his situation' (verses 18–21).

=== Verse 17 ===
[Eliphaz heard a voice saying:] Shall mortal man be more just than God?

shall a man be more pure than his maker?

- "Mortal man": translated from Hebrew: אֱנוֹשׁ, ʾenosh, which stresses man in all his frailty (his mortality), in parallel with the word for "man" in the second half of the verse, that is translated from גֶּבֶר, gever, which stresses more of the strength or might of man; put together to state that 'no human being of any kind' can be more righteous or pure than God the Creator.

== See also ==
- Providence
- Sin
- Related Bible parts: Genesis 15, Job 2, Job 42

== Sources ==
- Alter, Robert (2010). The Wisdom Books: Job, Proverbs, and Ecclesiastes: A Translation with Commentary. W.W. Norton & Co. ISBN 978-0393080735.
- Coogan, Michael David (2007). Coogan, Michael David; Brettler, Marc Zvi; Newsom, Carol Ann; Perkins, Pheme (eds.). The New Oxford Annotated Bible with the Apocryphal/Deuterocanonical Books: New Revised Standard Version, Issue 48 (Augmented 3rd ed.). Oxford University Press. ISBN 9780195288810.
- Crenshaw, James L. (2007). "17. Job". In Barton, John; Muddiman, John (eds.). The Oxford Bible Commentary (first (paperback) ed.). Oxford University Press. pp. 331–355. ISBN 978-0199277186.
- Estes, Daniel J. (2013). Walton, John H.; Strauss, Mark L. (eds.). Job. Teach the Text Commentary Series. United States: Baker Publishing Group. ISBN 9781441242778.
- Farmer, Kathleen A. (1998). "The Wisdom Books". In McKenzie, Steven L.; Graham, Matt Patrick (eds.). The Hebrew Bible Today: An Introduction to Critical Issues. Westminster John Knox Press. ISBN 978-0-66425652-4.
- Halley, Henry H. (1965). Halley's Bible Handbook: an abbreviated Bible commentary (24th (revised) ed.). Zondervan Publishing House. ISBN 0-310-25720-4.
- Kugler, Robert; Hartin, Patrick J. (2009). An Introduction to the Bible. Eerdmans. ISBN 978-0-8028-4636-5.
- Walton, John H. (2012). Job. United States: Zondervan. ISBN 9780310492009.
- Wilson, Lindsay (2015). Job. United States: Wm. B. Eerdmans Publishing Company. ISBN 9781467443289.
- Würthwein, Ernst (1995). The Text of the Old Testament. Translated by Rhodes, Erroll F. Grand Rapids, MI: Wm. B. Eerdmans. ISBN 0-8028-0788-7.
