= Job 3 =

3rd chapter of the Book of Job

- ← chapter 2 chapter 4 →
- The whole Book of Job in the Leningrad Codex (1008 C.E.) from an old facsimile edition.
- Book: Book of Job
- Hebrew Bible part: Ketuvim
- Order in the Hebrew part: 3
- Category: Sifrei Emet
- Christian Bible part: Old Testament
- Order in the Christian part: 18

Job 3 is the third chapter of the Book of Job in the Hebrew Bible or the Old Testament of the Christian Bible. The book is anonymous; most scholars believe it was written around the 6th century BCE. This chapter belongs to the Dialogue section of the book, comprising Job 3:1–31:40.

== Text ==
The original text is written in Hebrew language. This chapter is divided into 26 verses.

=== Textual witnesses ===
Some early manuscripts containing the text of this chapter in Hebrew are of the Masoretic Text, which includes the Aleppo Codex (10th century), and Codex Leningradensis (1008).

There is also a translation into Koine Greek known as the Septuagint, made in the last few centuries BC; some extant ancient manuscripts of this version include Codex Vaticanus (B; $\mathfrak{G}$^{B}; 4th century), Codex Sinaiticus (S; BHK: $\mathfrak{G}$^{S}; 4th century), and Codex Alexandrinus (A; $\mathfrak{G}$^{A}; 5th century).

== Analysis ==
The structure of the book is as follows:

- The Prologue (chapters 1–2)
- The Dialogue (chapters 3–31)
- The Verdicts (32:1–42:6)
- The Epilogue (42:7–17)

Within the structure, chapter 3 is grouped into the Dialogue section with the following outline:

- Job's Self-Curse and Self-Lament (3:1–26)
  - Job's Self-Curse (3:1–10)
  - Job's Self-Lament (3:11–26)
- Round One (4:1–14:22)
- Round Two (15:1–21:34)
- Round Three (22:1–27:23)
- Interlude – A Poem on Wisdom (28:1–28)
- Job's Summing Up (29:1–31:40)

The Dialogue section is composed in the format of poetry with distinctive syntax and grammar.

== Job curses his day of birth (3:1–10) ==
After the prose prologue in chapters 1–2, the narrator of the Book of Job fades away until reappearing in chapter 42, so there is no interpreter to explain the conversation among the individual speakers and the readers have to attentively follow the threads of the dialogue. When seven days had passed since the arrival of Job's three friends, Job finally released his 'pent-up emotions', by cursing the day of his birth (verses 2–10), before turning to questioning in verses 11–26. In all of his words, Job did not directly curse God as the Adversary had predicted (1:11) or his wife had suggested (2:9). Nothing in Job's "self-curse" or "self-imprecation" is inconsistent with his faith in God, Job's words are best understood as a bitter cry of pain or protest out of an existential dilemma, preserving faith in the midst of an experience of disorientation, rather than an incantation to destroy the creation, because of the inability of literal fulfillment.

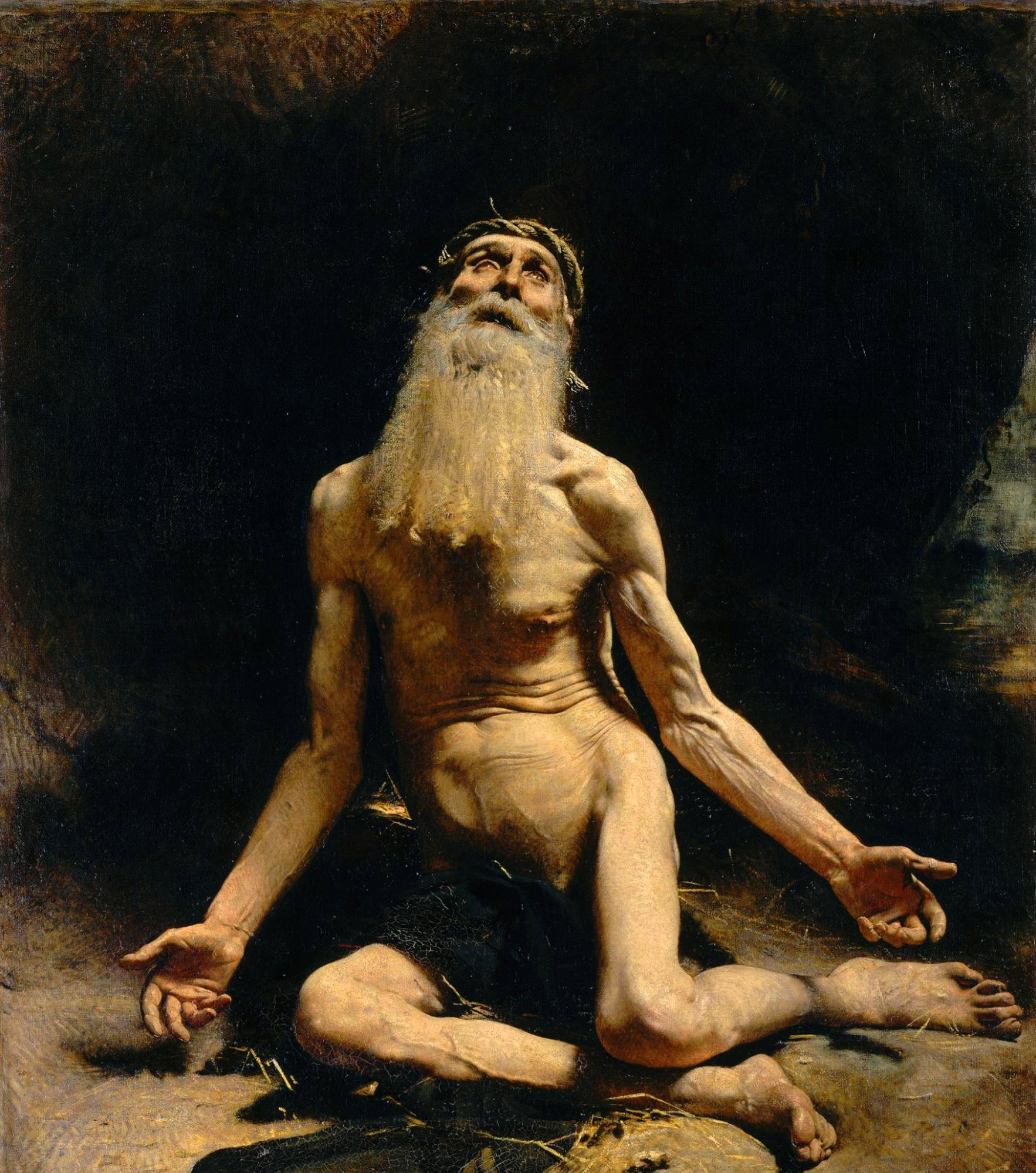
Job by Léon Bonnat (1880)

=== Verse 1 ===
After this opened Job his mouth, and cursed his day.

- "Cursed": from Hebrew: קָלַל, qalal; the usual Hebrew word for "curse" here is used instead of the euphemism בָרַךְ, barak ("bless"; cf. 2:5) which is used when God is the object of the verb. This is the only curse that Job uttered, although throughout the book, he gets desperately close to cursing God (the goal expected by the Adversary in Job 2:5), but until the end he never did.
- "His day": translated literally from Hebrew: יוֹמֽוֹ, yō-w-mōw; the context makes it clear that Job meant "the day of his birth". The Syriac version (Peshitta) reads “the day on which he was born.”

=== Verse 4 ===
[Job said:] As for that day, let it be darkness;

let God above not regard it;
and let not light shine upon it.

- "Let it be darkness": translated from Hebrew: יהי חשך, yə-hî ḥō-šeḵ; the wording that is the exact antithesis of Genesis 1:3, when God said "let there be light" (Hebrew: יהי אור, yə-hî ’ō-wr;) on the "first day", to describe Job's wish that "his first day" be darkness and since only God has this prerogative, Job adds that "God on high" would not regard that day.
- "Shine": translated from the Hebrew verb עָלָ֣יו, ‘ā-lāw that is the Hiphil of יָפַע, yafaʿ, which means here “cause to shine”. The subject of this verb is the hapax legomenon term נְהָרָה, neharah, “light”, that is derived from the verb נָהַר, nahar, “to gleam” (cf. Isaiah 60:5).

== Job's Self-Lament (3:11–26) ==
Job's lament in this section has two discrete parts:

- Job expresses the wish that he had never been born, proceeding immediately from womb to the netherworld (3:11–19)
- Job turns to the misery of his present life (3:20–26)

Each part commences with the Hebrew word לָ֤מָּה, lām-māh, "why".

The lament complements Job's initial cry (verses 1–10) with a series of rhetorical questions: posing an argument that because he was born (verse 10), the earliest chance he had of escaping this life of misery would have been to be still born (verses 11–12, 16), whereas in verses 13–19 Job regards death as 'falling into a peaceful sleep in a place where there is no trouble'. YHWH later poses His questions to Job (Job 38–41) that made Job realize that Job had been ignorant of the ways of the Lord.

=== Verse 11 ===
[Job said:] Why did I not die at birth,

come out from the womb and expire?"

The two halves of the verse use the prepositional phrases ("at birth", literally "from the womb", and "come out from the womb", literally, "from the belly I went out"), both in the temporal sense of “on emerging from the womb."

The 'twin images of death' in two halves of the verse ("die", "expire") contrast the 'two symbols of life' in verse 12 ("knees to receive me", "breasts to nurse").

== See also ==
- Lament
- Leviathan
- Suffering
- Related Bible parts: Genesis 1, Job 1, Job 2, Jeremiah 20

== Sources ==
- Alter, Robert (2010). The Wisdom Books: Job, Proverbs, and Ecclesiastes: A Translation with Commentary. W.W. Norton & Co. ISBN 978-0393080735.
- Coogan, Michael David (2007). Coogan, Michael David; Brettler, Marc Zvi; Newsom, Carol Ann; Perkins, Pheme (eds.). The New Oxford Annotated Bible with the Apocryphal/Deuterocanonical Books: New Revised Standard Version, Issue 48 (Augmented 3rd ed.). Oxford University Press. ISBN 9780195288810.
- Crenshaw, James L. (2007). "17. Job". In Barton, John; Muddiman, John (eds.). The Oxford Bible Commentary (first (paperback) ed.). Oxford University Press. pp. 331–355. ISBN 978-0199277186.
- Estes, Daniel J. (2013). Walton, John H.; Strauss, Mark L. (eds.). Job. Teach the Text Commentary Series. United States: Baker Publishing Group. ISBN 9781441242778.
- Farmer, Kathleen A. (1998). "The Wisdom Books". In McKenzie, Steven L.; Graham, Matt Patrick (eds.). The Hebrew Bible Today: An Introduction to Critical Issues. Westminster John Knox Press. ISBN 978-0-66425652-4.
- Halley, Henry H. (1965). Halley's Bible Handbook: an abbreviated Bible commentary (24th (revised) ed.). Zondervan Publishing House. ISBN 0-310-25720-4.
- Kugler, Robert; Hartin, Patrick J. (2009). An Introduction to the Bible. Eerdmans. ISBN 978-0-8028-4636-5.
- Walton, John H. (2012). Job. United States: Zondervan. ISBN 9780310492009.
- Wilson, Lindsay (2015). Job. United States: Wm. B. Eerdmans Publishing Company. ISBN 9781467443289.
- Würthwein, Ernst (1995). The Text of the Old Testament. Translated by Rhodes, Erroll F. Grand Rapids, MI: Wm. B. Eerdmans. ISBN 0-8028-0788-7.
