= Job 31 =

31st chapter of the Book of Job

- ← chapter 30 chapter 32 →
- The whole Book of Job in the Leningrad Codex (1008 C.E.) from an old facsimile edition.
- Book: Book of Job
- Hebrew Bible part: Ketuvim
- Order in the Hebrew part: 3
- Category: Sifrei Emet
- Christian Bible part: Old Testament
- Order in the Christian part: 18

Job 31 is the 31st chapter of the Book of Job in the Hebrew Bible or the Old Testament of the Christian Bible. The book is anonymous; most scholars believe it was written around the 6th century BCE. This chapter records the speech of Job, which belongs to the Dialogue section of the book, comprising Job 3:1–31:40.

== Text ==
The original text is written in Hebrew language. This chapter is divided into 40 verses.

=== Textual witnesses ===
Some early manuscripts containing the text of this chapter in Hebrew are of the Masoretic Text, which includes the Aleppo Codex (10th century), and Codex Leningradensis (1008). Fragments containing parts of this chapter in Hebrew were found among the Dead Sea Scrolls including 4Q99 (4QJob^{a}; 175–60 BCE) with extant verses 14–19 and 4Q100 (4QJob^{b}; 50–1 BCE) with extant verses 20–21.

There is also a translation into Koine Greek known as the Septuagint, made in the last few centuries BCE; some extant ancient manuscripts of this version include Codex Vaticanus (B; $\mathfrak{G}$^{B}; 4th century), Codex Sinaiticus (S; BHK: $\mathfrak{G}$^{S}; 4th century), and Codex Alexandrinus (A; $\mathfrak{G}$^{A}; 5th century).

== Analysis ==
The structure of the book is as follows:

- The Prologue (chapters 1–2)
- The Dialogue (chapters 3–31)
- The Verdicts (32:1–42:6)
- The Epilogue (42:7–17)

Within the structure, chapter 31 is grouped into the Dialogue section with the following outline:

- Job's Self-Curse and Self-Lament (3:1–26)
- Round One (4:1–14:22)
- Round Two (15:1–21:34)
- Round Three (22:1–27:23)
- Interlude – A Poem on Wisdom (28:1–28)
- Job's Summing Up (29:1–31:40)
  - Job's Former Prosperity (29:1–25)
    - Job's Former Blessings (29:1–6)
    - Job's Former Honor (29:7–10)
    - Job's Former Role in Administering Justice (29:11–17)
    - Job's Expectation of Ongoing Peace (29:18–20)
    - Job's Prominence in the Community (29:21–25)
  - Job's Present Suffering (30:1–31)
    - How Job Would Have Viewed His Mockers (30:1–8)
    - The Attacks of His Enemies (30:9–15)
    - God Is Causing His Present Sufferings (30:16–19)
    - Accusing God (30:20–23)
    - Withdrawing into Despair (30:24–31)
  - Job's Final Defense (31:1–40)
    - His Rejection of Lust (31:1–4)
    - His Denial of Falsehood and Deceit (31:5–8)
    - His Avoidance of Adultery (31:9–12)
    - His Care for His Servants (31:13–15)
    - His Righteousness in Dealing with the Poor and Marginalized (31:16–23)
    - His Refusal to Worship Money or Other Gods (31:24–28)
    - Not Guilty of a Variety of Wrongs (31:29–34)
    - The Call for God to Answer (31:35–37)
    - His Right Treatment of the Land (31:38–40)

The Dialogue section is composed in the format of poetry with distinctive syntax and grammar. At the end of the Dialogue, Job sums up his speech in a comprehensive review (chapters 29–31), with Job 29 describes Job's former prosperity, Job 30 focuses on Job's current suffering and Job 31 outlines Job's final defense. The whole part is framed by Job's longing for a restored relationship with God (Job 29:2) and the legal challenge to God (Job 31:35–27). Chapter 31 contains Job's final defense before God, in which he pledges the "oath of clearance", a form of self-curse, that is calling down upon oneself the wrath of God, if what the person is swearing is false. This chapter has been regarded as an important source to understand the Hebrew Bible (Old Testament) perspective of "personal ethics of a righteous person". There is no clear structure of Job's oath of clearance as it lists a succession of possible breaches of laws, starting with an "if" and extending throughout the chapter.

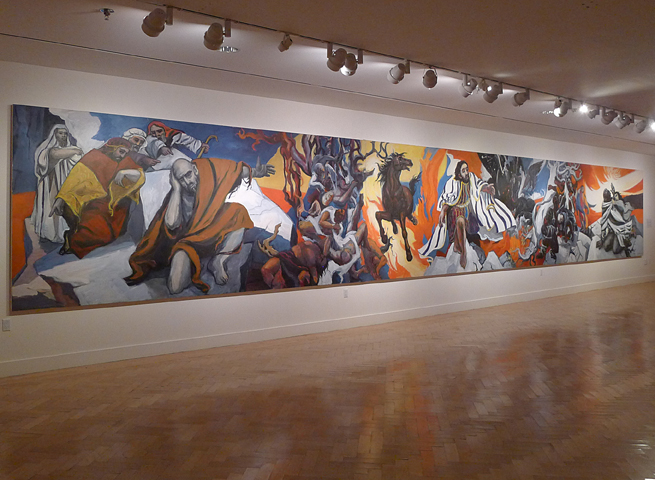
"The story of Job". Mural painted by Hugh Mesibov for the Temple Beth El (Spring Valley, NY) (1972).

== Job has rejected evil (31:1–12) ==
One by one, Job lists his attitudes and actions, which reject evil in this section of his oath of clearance. These evil deeds include lust towards young (unmarried) girls (verses 2–4), falsehood and deceit (verses 5–6), moral impurities (verses 7–8), and adultery (verses 9–12).

=== Verse 6 ===
[Job said:] "Let me be weighed in an even balance

that God may know my integrity."

- "Even balance": translated from the Hebrew term מֹאזְנֵי־צֶ֑דֶק mō-zə-nê-tse-ḏeq—literally, "scales of righteousness"; that is, scales that conform to the standard (Deuteronomy 25:13–15) so they can properly be used in trade and justice.

== Job has behaved righteously (31:13–34) ==
In this section Job lists how he treated his servants (verses 13–15), the poor and marginalized (verses 16–23; refuting Eliphaz's charges in Job 22:5–9), his refusal to trust in riches (verse 24–25) or adopt pagan worship practices (verses 26–28) and some other accusations of sins (verses 29–32). Job strongly denies that he hides any sins (verses 33–34).

=== Verse 15 ===
[Job said:] "Did not He who made me in the womb make him?

And did not the same One fashion us in the womb?"

Job treats his slaves beyond what is required in the Mosaic law (cf. Exodus 21:1-11; Leviticus 25:39-55; Deuteronomy 15:12-18). In the ancient Near East, slaves were typically regarded as property, but Job views his slaves as fellow humans made by God, possessing the same human rights.

== Job's final plea of vindication (31:35–40) ==
The last part begins with an appeal to compel a plaintiff to present any evidence of Job's wrongdoings. This is seen within the boundary of true piety as a righteous man seeking vindication. Job completes the last part of his oath of clearance by stating his right treatment of the land. After these statements, there is a note that "the words of Job are ended"; that is, Job ends his dispute with God at this point, although Job will still make two short contributions in response of God's speeches (Job 40:3–5; 42:1–6).

=== Verse 40 ===
[Job said:] "Let thistles grow instead of wheat,

and weeds instead of barley."

The words of Job are ended.

- "Weeds": translated from the Hebrew word בָּאְשָׁה (boʾshah, from בָּאַשׁ [baʾas, "to have a foul smell"]) referring to "foul-smelling weeds."

== See also ==
- Boasting
- Charity (practice)
- Mourning
- Omniscience
- Poverty
- Pride
- Self-pity
- Related Bible parts: Job 1, Job 2, Job 30, Job 42

== Sources ==
- Alter, Robert (2010). The Wisdom Books: Job, Proverbs, and Ecclesiastes: A Translation with Commentary. W.W. Norton & Co. ISBN 978-0393080735.
- Coogan, Michael David (2007). Coogan, Michael David; Brettler, Marc Zvi; Newsom, Carol Ann; Perkins, Pheme (eds.). The New Oxford Annotated Bible with the Apocryphal/Deuterocanonical Books: New Revised Standard Version, Issue 48 (Augmented 3rd ed.). Oxford University Press. ISBN 9780195288810.
- Crenshaw, James L. (2007). "17. Job". In Barton, John; Muddiman, John (eds.). The Oxford Bible Commentary (first (paperback) ed.). Oxford University Press. pp. 331–355. ISBN 978-0199277186.
- Estes, Daniel J. (2013). Walton, John H.; Strauss, Mark L. (eds.). Job. Teach the Text Commentary Series. United States: Baker Publishing Group. ISBN 9781441242778.
- Farmer, Kathleen A. (1998). "The Wisdom Books". In McKenzie, Steven L.; Graham, Matt Patrick (eds.). The Hebrew Bible Today: An Introduction to Critical Issues. Westminster John Knox Press. ISBN 978-0-66425652-4.
- Fitzmyer, Joseph A. (2008). A Guide to the Dead Sea Scrolls and Related Literature. Grand Rapids, MI: William B. Eerdmans Publishing Company. ISBN 9780802862419.
- Halley, Henry H. (1965). Halley's Bible Handbook: an abbreviated Bible commentary (24th (revised) ed.). Zondervan Publishing House. ISBN 0-310-25720-4.
- Kugler, Robert; Hartin, Patrick J. (2009). An Introduction to the Bible. Eerdmans. ISBN 978-0-8028-4636-5.
- Ulrich, Eugene, ed. (2010). The Biblical Qumran Scrolls: Transcriptions and Textual Variants. Brill.
- Walton, John H. (2012). Job. United States: Zondervan. ISBN 9780310492009.
- Wilson, Lindsay (2015). Job. United States: Wm. B. Eerdmans Publishing Company. ISBN 9781467443289.
- Würthwein, Ernst (1995). The Text of the Old Testament. Translated by Rhodes, Erroll F. Grand Rapids, MI: Wm. B. Eerdmans. ISBN 0-8028-0788-7.
