= Job 42 =

Last chapter of the Book of Job

- ← chapter 41 Psalm 1 →
- The whole Book of Job in the Leningrad Codex (1008 C.E.) from an old facsimile edition.
- Book: Book of Job
- Hebrew Bible part: Ketuvim
- Order in the Hebrew part: 3
- Category: Sifrei Emet
- Christian Bible part: Old Testament
- Order in the Christian part: 18

Job 42 is the 42nd (and the final) chapter of the Book of Job in the Hebrew Bible or the Old Testament of the Christian Bible. The book is anonymous; most scholars believe it was written around 6th century BCE. The first part of this chapter belongs to the dialogue section of Job 32:1–42:6 and the second part is the epilogue of the book comprising Job 42:7–17.

== Text ==
The original text is written in Hebrew language. This chapter is divided into 17 verses.

=== Textual witnesses ===
Some early manuscripts containing the text of this chapter in Hebrew are of the Masoretic Text, which includes the Aleppo Codex (10th century), and Codex Leningradensis (1008).

There is also a translation into Koine Greek known as the Septuagint, made in the last few centuries BC; some extant ancient manuscripts of this version include Codex Vaticanus (B; $\mathfrak{G}$^{B}; 4th century), Codex Sinaiticus (S; BHK: $\mathfrak{G}$^{S}; 4th century), and Codex Alexandrinus (A; $\mathfrak{G}$^{A}; 5th century).

== Analysis ==
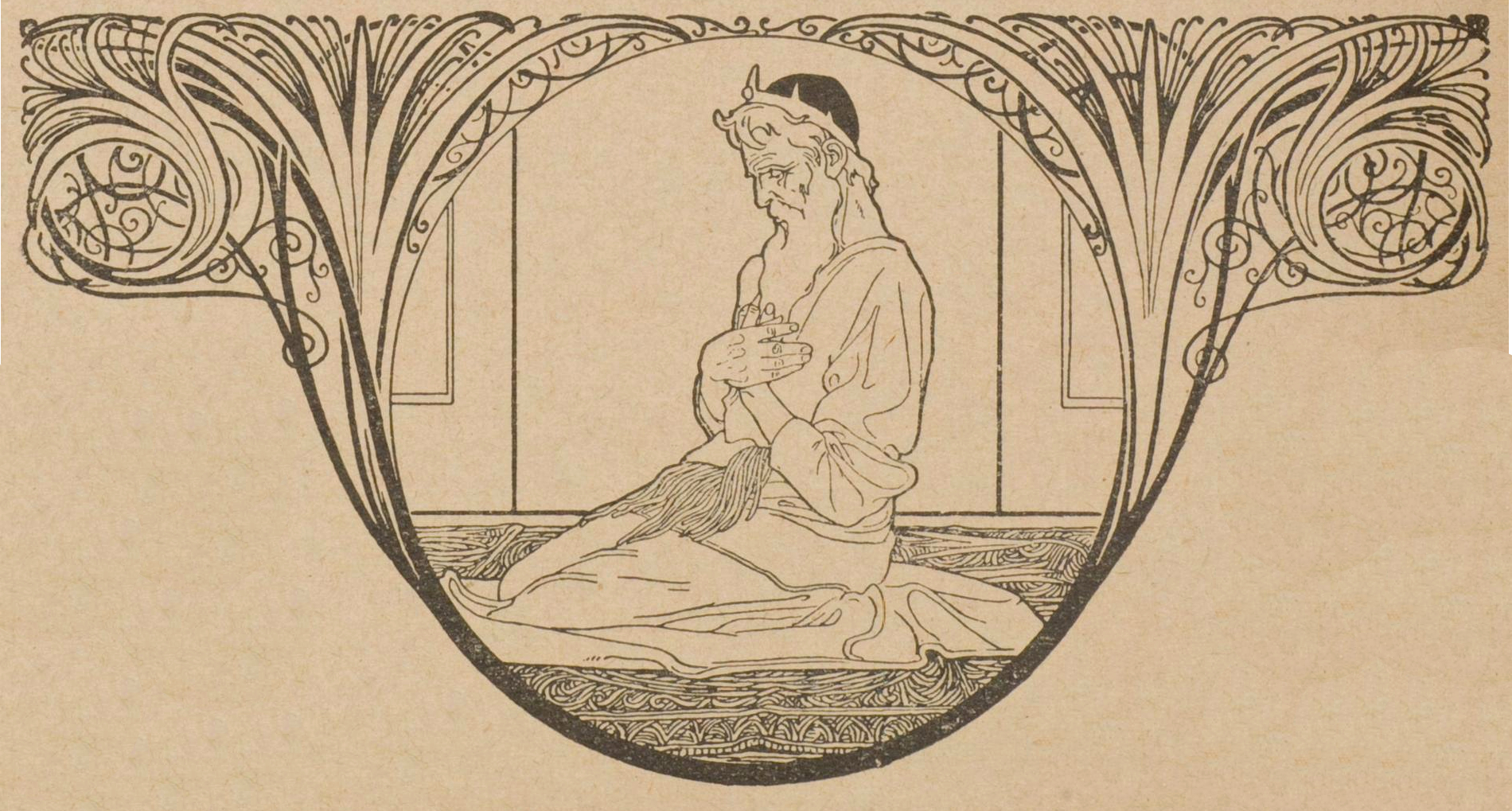
"Job interceding for his friends." From Biblisches Lesebuch fuer den Schulgebrauch, by Ephraim Moses Lilien (1914).

The structure of the book is as follows:

- The Prologue (chapters 1–2)
- The Dialogue (chapters 3–31)
- The Verdicts (32:1–42:6)
- The Epilogue (42:7–17)

Within the structure, chapters 42 consists of two sections that are grouped separately as in the following outline:

- The Verdicts (32:1–42:6)
  - Elihu's Verdict (32:1–37:24)
  - God's Appearance (Yahweh Speeches) and Job's Responses (38:1–42:6)
    - God's First Speech (38:1–40:2)
    - Job's First Reply – An Insufficient Response (40:3–5)
    - God's Second Speech (40:6–41:34)
    - Job's Second Reply (42:1–6)
      - Job's Sufficient Response (42:1–5)
      - Job's New Direction (42:6)
- The Epilogue (42:7–17)
  - Job Has Spoken Rightly about God (42:7–9)
  - Job Is Doubly Restored (42:10–17)

== Job's second response (42:1–6) ==
After YHWH speaks to Job (Job 38:1–40:2), Job gives a tentative response (Job 40:3–5), so YHWH continues with a second speech (40:6–41:34), including detailed descriptions of Behemoth and Leviathan, which evokes a more definite response from Job as noted in this passage (Job 42:1–6). This time Job admits that he has gotten a 'more accurate understanding' about YHWH and about himself as a 'finite mortal under YHWH's authority'.

Verses 2–6 has the following structure:

A. Job's starting point – God is powerful (verse 2)

B. Quotation from YHWH's speeches (verse 3a)

C. Job's response – he spoke with limited knowledge (verse 3b-c)

B'. Quotation from YHWH's speeches (verse 4)

C'. Job's response – the situation has changed (verse 6)

A'. Job's new direction (verse 6)

=== Verse 3 ===
[Job says:] ^{a}‘Who is he who hides counsel without knowledge?’

^{b}Therefore I have uttered what I did not understand,
^{c}things too wonderful for me which I did not know.

- Clause (a) is Job's restatement of God's question (Job 38:2) before he answers it in clauses (b) and (c). YHWH's questions in the speeches have changed Job's understanding that he realizes how much he does not know.
- "Wonderful": translated from the Hebrew word פָלָא, pala or pele, which refers to 'information in the divine realm that is beyond human understanding' or "supernatural". In the Hebrew Bible this word is used to describe knowledge of God's name (Judges 13:18) and God's wondrous acts (Exodus 3:20; Joshua 3:5; Judges 6:13; Psalm 139:6). In the Book of Job, this word occurs 6 times, in Job 5:9; 9:10; 10:16; 37:5, 14; 42:3, each instance of which helps to understand its meaning.

=== Verse 5 ===
[Job says:] I have heard of You by the hearing of the ear,

but now my eye sees You.

Here Job distinguishes between the 'secondhand experience' ("my ears had heard"; "hearsay") and 'firsthand experience' ("now my eyes have seen"), which gives him a better understanding (verse 6).

=== Verse 6 ===
[Job says:] "Therefore I abhor myself,

and repent in dust and ashes"

- "Abhor": or "despise" (such as in NRSV, NIV, ESV) translated from the Hebrew word מָאַס, mā'as, which has a core meaning of "reject" or "retract"; in this case, Job "rejects" or "retracts" his litigation against God (cf. usage in Job 31:13 against a legal case or suit).
- "Repent": translated from the Hebrew word נָחַם, nakham, "to be sorry, console oneself". It can refer to 'human repentance for wrongdoing' (Jeremiah 8:6; 31:19), or 'change of attitude out of compassion' (Judges 21:6, 15), or 'moving from a right course of action to a wrong one' (Exodus 13:17). God is said to be 'repenting' of the good he intended to do (Jeremiah 18:10). Here the word implied "regret", that Job regrets his earlier statements: 'his characterization of God, his presumptuous belief in his own understanding and his arrogant challenges'. The verb should be distinguished from other Hebrew words that can also be translated as "repent", such as shub ("return", to change a behavior), which was used by Eliphaz to urge Job to "repent" from his presumptively 'great sin' (Job 22:23), because in 42:6 Job does not suggest a behavior change, but suggest a wish to retract his previous statements.

== Narrative epilogue (42:7–17) ==
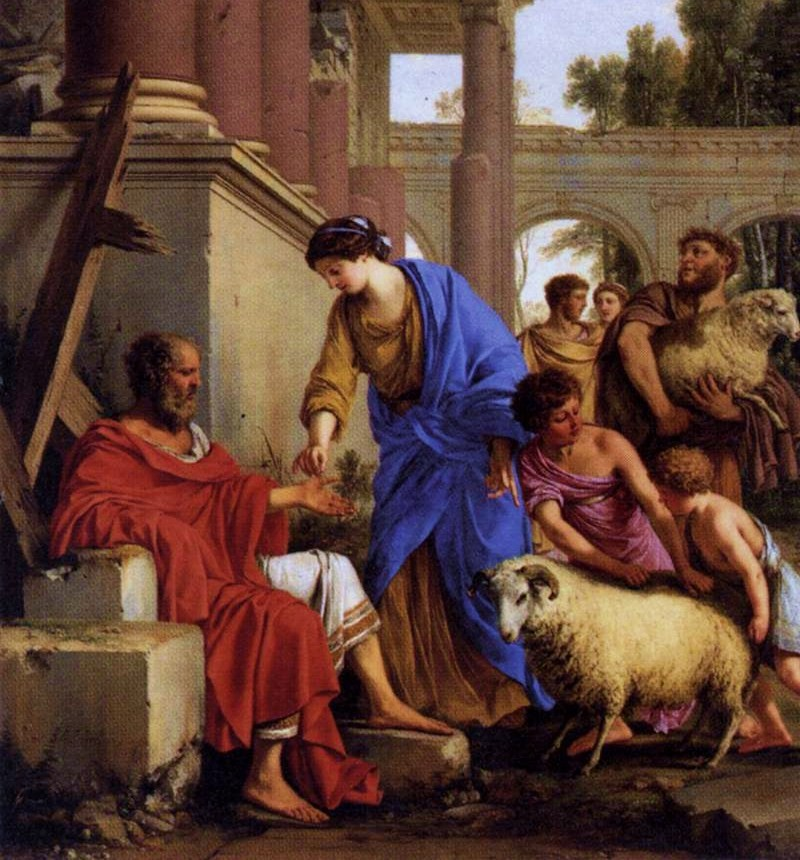
"Job restored to prosperity"; painting by Laurent de La Hyre (1648).

The prose epilogue consists of two conclusions: the first part contains YHWH's commendation of Job for speaking correctly and YHWH's rebuke of Job's three friends (verses 7–9) and second part describes the restoration of Job, a complete life with additional seven sons and three beautiful daughters along with plenty of possession, even enjoying two additional lifespans and seeing four generations of descendants until he dies 'old and full of days' (verses 10–17).

=== Verse 7 ===
And so it was, that after the LORD had spoken these words to Job, the LORD said to Eliphaz the Temanite, "My wrath is kindled against you and against your two friends, for you have not spoken of Me what is right as My servant Job has."

Job's friends tried to protect YHWH's reputation by insisting that Job must have sinned, which is extrapolating the divine retribution principle, that reduced YHWH to a 'predictable deity' confined to a fixed formula. On the other hand, despite Job's complaints about God's justice and fairness, God knows completely what in Job's heart and has evaluated Job on the basis of that perfect understanding.

=== Verse 17 ===
So Job died, old and full of days.

- "Old and full of days": from the Hebrew phrase זקן ושבע ימים, zā-qên ū-śə-ḇa‘ yā-mîm, "old and sated/satisfied (in) days", which echoes the experiences of Abraham (Genesis 25:8; זקן ושבע, zā-qên wə-śā-ḇê-a‘, "old and sated/satisfied"), Isaac (Genesis 35:29; זקן ושבע ימים, zā-qên ū-śə-ḇa‘ yā-mîm, "old and sated/satisfied (in) days"), and David (1 Chronicles 29:28; שבע ימים, śə-ḇa‘ yā-mîm, "sated/satisfied (in) days").
- Lutheran writer Johann Bengel notes that the Septuagint and Theodotion add Greek: γέγραπται δὲ αὐτὸν πάλιν ἀναστήσεσθαι μεθʼ ὧν ὁ κύριος ἀνίστησιν, meaning
  but it is written that he shall rise again with those whom the Lord raises.
  Bengel suggests from this wording that Job may have been among those whose bodies were raised on the occurrence of Jesus' death in Matthew's Gospel (Matthew 27:52).

== See also ==
- Bildad the Shuhite
- Divine providence
- Divine retribution
- Eliphaz the Temanite
- Jemima
- Keren-happuch
- Kesitah
- Keziah
- Sacrifice
- YHWH
- Zophar the Naamathite
- Related Bible parts: Genesis 25, Genesis 35, 1 Chronicles 29, Job 1, Job 2

== Sources ==
- Alter, Robert (2010). The Wisdom Books: Job, Proverbs, and Ecclesiastes: A Translation with Commentary. W.W. Norton & Co. ISBN 978-0393080735.
- Coogan, Michael David (2007). Coogan, Michael David; Brettler, Marc Zvi; Newsom, Carol Ann; Perkins, Pheme (eds.). The New Oxford Annotated Bible with the Apocryphal/Deuterocanonical Books: New Revised Standard Version, Issue 48 (Augmented 3rd ed.). Oxford University Press. ISBN 9780195288810.
- Crenshaw, James L. (2007). "17. Job". In Barton, John; Muddiman, John (eds.). The Oxford Bible Commentary (first (paperback) ed.). Oxford University Press. pp. 331–355. ISBN 978-0199277186.
- Estes, Daniel J. (2013). Walton, John H.; Strauss, Mark L. (eds.). Job. Teach the Text Commentary Series. United States: Baker Publishing Group. ISBN 9781441242778.
- Farmer, Kathleen A. (1998). "The Wisdom Books". In McKenzie, Steven L.; Graham, Matt Patrick (eds.). The Hebrew Bible Today: An Introduction to Critical Issues. Westminster John Knox Press. ISBN 978-0-66425652-4.
- Halley, Henry H. (1965). Halley's Bible Handbook: an abbreviated Bible commentary (24th (revised) ed.). Zondervan Publishing House. ISBN 0-310-25720-4.
- Kugler, Robert; Hartin, Patrick J. (2009). An Introduction to the Bible. Eerdmans. ISBN 978-0-8028-4636-5.
- Walton, John H. (2012). Job. United States: Zondervan. ISBN 9780310492009.
- Wilson, Lindsay (2015). Job. United States: Wm. B. Eerdmans Publishing Company. ISBN 9781467443289.
- Würthwein, Ernst (1995). The Text of the Old Testament. Translated by Rhodes, Erroll F. Grand Rapids, MI: Wm. B. Eerdmans. ISBN 0-8028-0788-7.
