= Job 1 =

First chapter of the Book of Job

- ← Esther 10 chapter 2 →
- The whole Book of Job in the Leningrad Codex (1008 C.E.) from an old facsimile edition.
- Book: Book of Job
- Hebrew Bible part: Ketuvim
- Order in the Hebrew part: 3
- Category: Sifrei Emet
- Christian Bible part: Old Testament
- Order in the Christian part: 18

Job 1 is the first chapter of the Book of Job in the Hebrew Bible or the Old Testament of the Christian Bible. The book is anonymous; most scholars believe it was written around 6th century BCE. This chapter belongs to the prologue of the book, comprising Job 1:1–2:13.

== Text ==
The original text is written in the Hebrew language. This chapter is divided into 22 verses.

=== Textual witnesses ===
Some early manuscripts containing the text of this chapter in Hebrew are of the Masoretic Text, which includes the Aleppo Codex (10th century), and Codex Leningradensis (1008).

There is also a translation into Koine Greek known as the Septuagint, made in the last few centuries BC; some extant ancient manuscripts of this version include Codex Vaticanus (B; $\mathfrak{G}$^{B}; 4th century), Codex Sinaiticus (S; BHK: $\mathfrak{G}$^{S}; 4th century), and Codex Alexandrinus (A; $\mathfrak{G}$^{A}; 5th century).

== Analysis ==
Within the structure of the book, chapters 1 and 2 are grouped as "the Prologue" with the following outline:

- Job Is Utterly Righteous (1:1–5)
- The First Heavenly Court Scene (1:6–12)
- The First Test - Loss of Possessions and Family (1:13–19)
- Job's First Reaction to His Loss and the Narrator's Verdict (1:20–22)
- The Second Heavenly Court Scene (2:1–6)
- The Second Test - Ghastly Sores (2:7–10)
- The Arrival and Mission of the Friends (2:11–13)

The whole section precedes the following parts of the book:

- The Dialogue (chapters 3–31)
- The Verdicts (32:1–42:6)
- The Epilogue (42:7–17)

The Prologue consists of five scenes in prose form (1:1–5; 1:6–12; 1:13–22; 2:1–6; 2:7–13 (3:1)) — alternating between earth and heaven — which introduce the main characters and the theological issue to be explored.

== Job's profile (1:1–5) ==
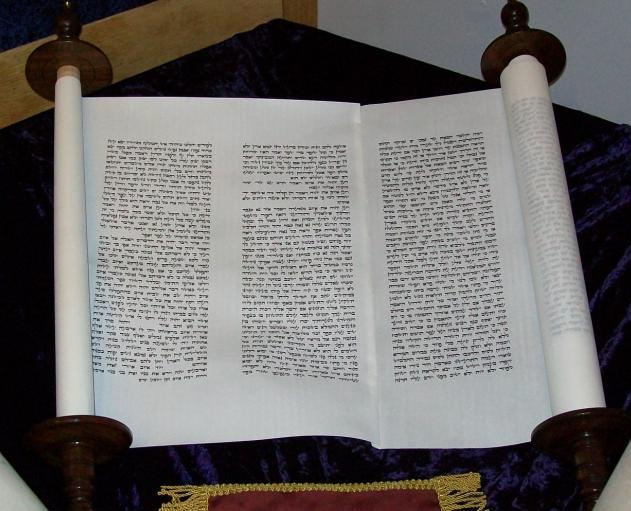
Scroll of Book of Job, in Hebrew

After stating Job's place of residence (which until now cannot be positively identified), this section provides the information about:

- Job's qualities: "blameless" (Hebrew: tam) and "upright" (yašar) (1:1)
- Job's possessions and status (1:2–3)
- Job's piety (1:4–5)

=== Verse 1 ===
There was a man in the land of Uz, whose name was Job; and that man was blameless and upright, and one who feared God and shunned evil.

- "Land of Uz": the exact location is hard to determine, but significantly it is outside the land of Israel, setting the stage for a universal, rather than an Israelite discussion of the topic of the book.
- "Job": the mention of his name in the Book of Ezekiel chapter 14 in the Old Testament (Hebrew Bible) and the Epistle of James chapter 5 in the New Testament of Christian Bibles argues for the historicity of the person, but without any supports from non-biblical ancient documents, he is regarded as a legendary character.

Job's qualities are given in an unparalleled fourfold description:

- "blameless" (Hebrew: tam; cf. Genesis 20:5, 6:1 Kings 9:4; Psalm 7:8; 25:21; 26:1, 11; 41:12; 78:72)
- "upright" (Hebrew: yasar, "straight, whole, just")
- "one who feared God"
- [one who] "shunned evil"

The word pair – "blameless" and "upright" – is parallel in Psalm 37:37. The most crucial description is that Job "feared God", which is picked up by "the Adversary" (the "Satan") in verse 9 as a representative description of Job's supposed righteousness. The expression "fearing God/Yahweh" is used in Proverb 1:7, 29; 2:5; 3:7; 8:13; 9:10; 10:27; 14:2, 26, 27; 15:16, 33;16:6;19:23; 22:4; 23:17; 24:21; 31:30; Ecclesiastes 5:7: 7:18; 8:12; 12:13; Psalm 15:4; 19:9; 34:9, 11; 111:10.

== First conversation (1:6–12) ==
The passage describes a gathering in heaven, where the hidden drama is revealed for the readers to understand the background of the coming events, but cannot be seen by Job and the people around him. During this heavenly court, God (Hebrew: YHWH) extols the virtue of Job, but "the adversary" (Hebrew: ha-satan) challenges the reasons for it, so he receives permission from God to 'try to dislodge Job from his integrity'; that is, 'God is using Job to prove Satan's theory wrong'.

=== Verse 6 ===
Now there was a day when the sons of God came to present themselves before the Lord, and the Adversary also came among them.

- "The sons of God": from Hebrew: בני האלהים, bə-nê hā-’ĕ-lō-hîm. This phrase only occur in Hebrew Bible in Genesis 6:2, 4; Job 1:6; 2:1; 38:7, whereas there are comparable phrases bənê ’ĕlîm in Psalm 29:1; 89:7, and bənê ’ĕlyon in Psalm 89:7. The use of this designation outside the Bible, mostly in the Ugaritic texts, relates the idea of functionaries who make up a divine council, where the business of heaven is done.
- "The Adversary": from Hebrew השטן, hā-śā-ṭān, can be rendered as "the accuser" or "the challenger". This Hebrew word has traditionally been transliterated with capitalization as a proper name "Satan", leading an association with the "devil", named as "Satan" in the New Testament, who is depicted as unsuccessfully trying to tempt Jesus (Matthew 4:1–11) and as resisting the rule of God (Revelation 12:9; 20:2, 7–8). The word is written with the Hebrew definitive article ה, ha, in the Hebrew Bible (including in Numbers 22:22, 32; Zechariah 3:1–2), except in 1 Chronicles 21:1, which only use the word "satan", so it seems to refer to a function rather than a proper name of an individual.

=== Verse 9 ===
Then the Adversary answered the Lord, saying, "Has Job feared God for nothing?"

- "For nothing": The Hebrew form of this phrase has the interrogative ה, he, on the adverb חִנָּם, khinnam ("gratis"), a derivative either of the verb חָנַן khanan ("to be gracious, show favor") or of its related noun חֵן, khen ("grace, favor"), so the adverb has the sense of "free; gratis; gratuitously; for nothing; for no reason".

== Devastation of Job (1:13–22) ==
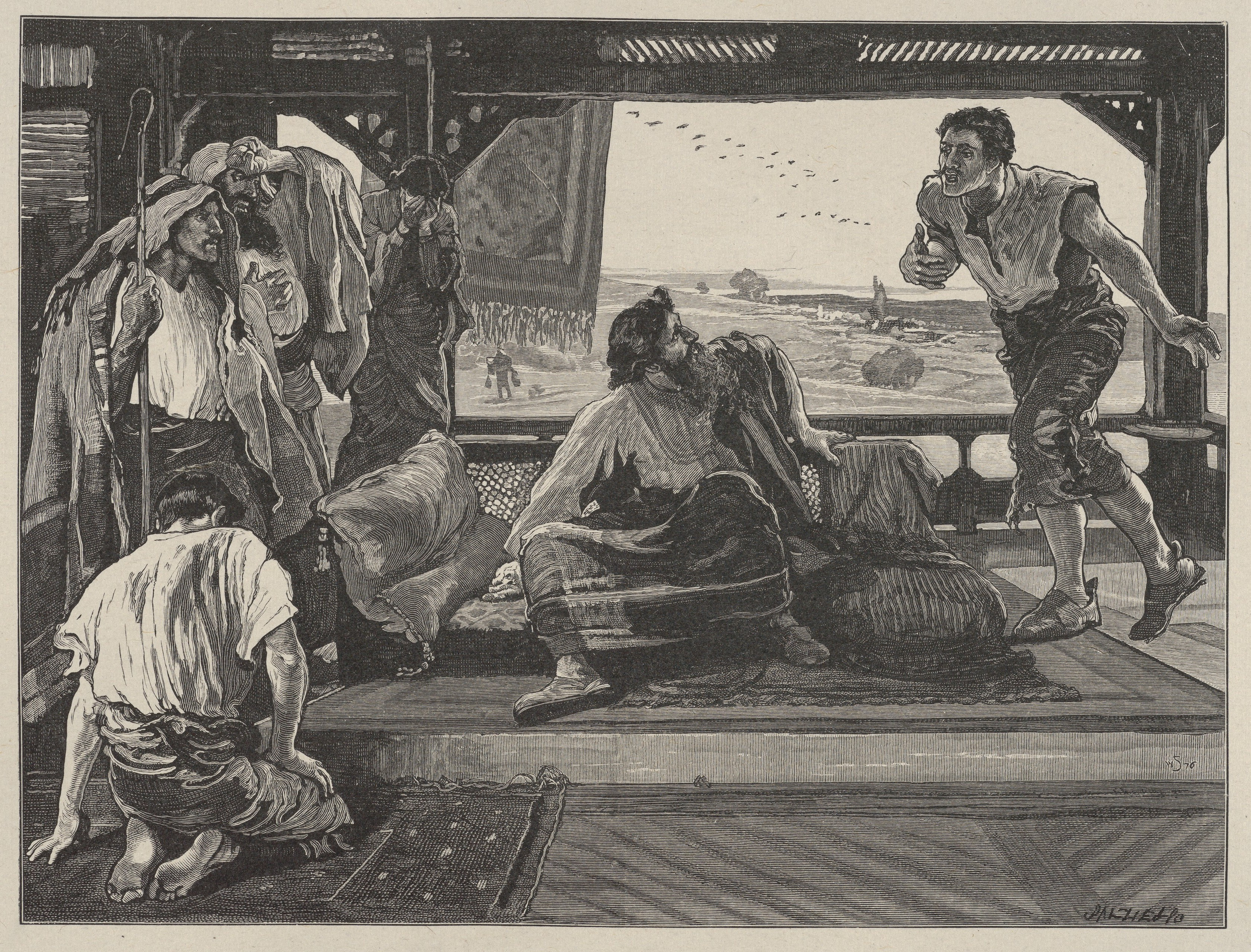
"Job Receiving the Messengers", by William Small (Dalziels' Bible Gallery), 1876–1881.

This section lists a series of disasters, of different kinds, one after another, that befell Job, who could only listen to the reports without any knowledge of the hand of the accuser and the purposes of God. The patterns of disasters have a symmetry: the losses of Job's possessions alternate between those executed by humans (the Sabeans, the Chaldeans) and those brought about by natural or supernatural causes (lightning, whirlwind), each time with increasing intensities: larger and more valuable animals and at last the most valuable ones: Job's children. Job's response to this set of losses (Verses 20–21) presents him as a model of piety: the tearing of garments (cf. Genesis 37:29; Joshua 7:6) and shaving of head (cf. Isaiah 15:2; 22:12; Jeremiah 7:29; 16:6; 41:5; 47:5; 48:37; Ezekiel 7:18; Amos 8:10; Micah 1:16) as a common rite of mourning in the local culture in ancient times. The righteous nature of Job's response is endorsed by the narrator in verse 22.

=== Verse 21 ===
And he said, “Naked I came from my mother's womb, and naked shall I return. The Lord gave, and the Lord has taken away; blessed be the name of the Lord.”

- "Naked": from a Hebrew adjective which functions here as an 'adverbial accusative of state, explicative of the state of the subject', and while including the literal sense of nakedness at birth, it is also used symbolically to mean “without possessions.”
- Job's statement here is parallel to the New Testament verse 1 Timothy 6:7.

== See also ==
- Chaldeans
- Job
- Land of Uz
- Sabeans
- Satan
- Sacrifice
- YHWH
- Related Bible parts: Joshua 7, Ezekiel 14, Zechariah 3, 1 Timothy 6, James 5

== Sources ==
- Alter, Robert (2010). The Wisdom Books: Job, Proverbs, and Ecclesiastes: A Translation with Commentary. W.W. Norton & Co. ISBN 978-0393080735.
- Coogan, Michael David (2007). Coogan, Michael David; Brettler, Marc Zvi; Newsom, Carol Ann; Perkins, Pheme (eds.). The New Oxford Annotated Bible with the Apocryphal/Deuterocanonical Books: New Revised Standard Version, Issue 48 (Augmented 3rd ed.). Oxford University Press. ISBN 9780195288810.
- Crenshaw, James L. (2007). "17. Job". In Barton, John; Muddiman, John (eds.). The Oxford Bible Commentary (first (paperback) ed.). Oxford University Press. pp. 331–355. ISBN 978-0199277186.
- Estes, Daniel J. (2013). Walton, John H.; Strauss, Mark L. (eds.). Job. Teach the Text Commentary Series. United States: Baker Publishing Group. ISBN 9781441242778.
- Farmer, Kathleen A. (1998). "The Wisdom Books". In McKenzie, Steven L.; Graham, Matt Patrick (eds.). The Hebrew Bible Today: An Introduction to Critical Issues. Westminster John Knox Press. ISBN 978-0-66425652-4.
- Halley, Henry H. (1965). Halley's Bible Handbook: an abbreviated Bible commentary (24th (revised) ed.). Zondervan Publishing House. ISBN 0-310-25720-4.
- Kugler, Robert; Hartin, Patrick J. (2009). An Introduction to the Bible. Eerdmans. ISBN 978-0-8028-4636-5.
- Walton, John H. (2012). Job. United States: Zondervan. ISBN 9780310492009.
- Wilson, Lindsay (2015). Job. United States: Wm. B. Eerdmans Publishing Company. ISBN 9781467443289.
- Würthwein, Ernst (1995). The Text of the Old Testament. Translated by Rhodes, Erroll F. Grand Rapids, MI: Wm. B. Eerdmans. ISBN 0-8028-0788-7.
