= Henry Hampton Halley =

American Christian writer (1874–1965)

- Born: 10 April 1874; White Sulphur, Scott County, Kentucky
- Died: 23 May 1965 (aged 91); Chicago, Illinois
- Education: Transylvania University
- Occupations: Author of Halley's Bible Handbook and Christian pastor

Henry Hampton Halley (April 10, 1874 – May 23, 1965) was an American Christian Church (Disciples of Christ) minister and religious writer. He was best known as author of Halley's Bible Handbook, first published in 1924.

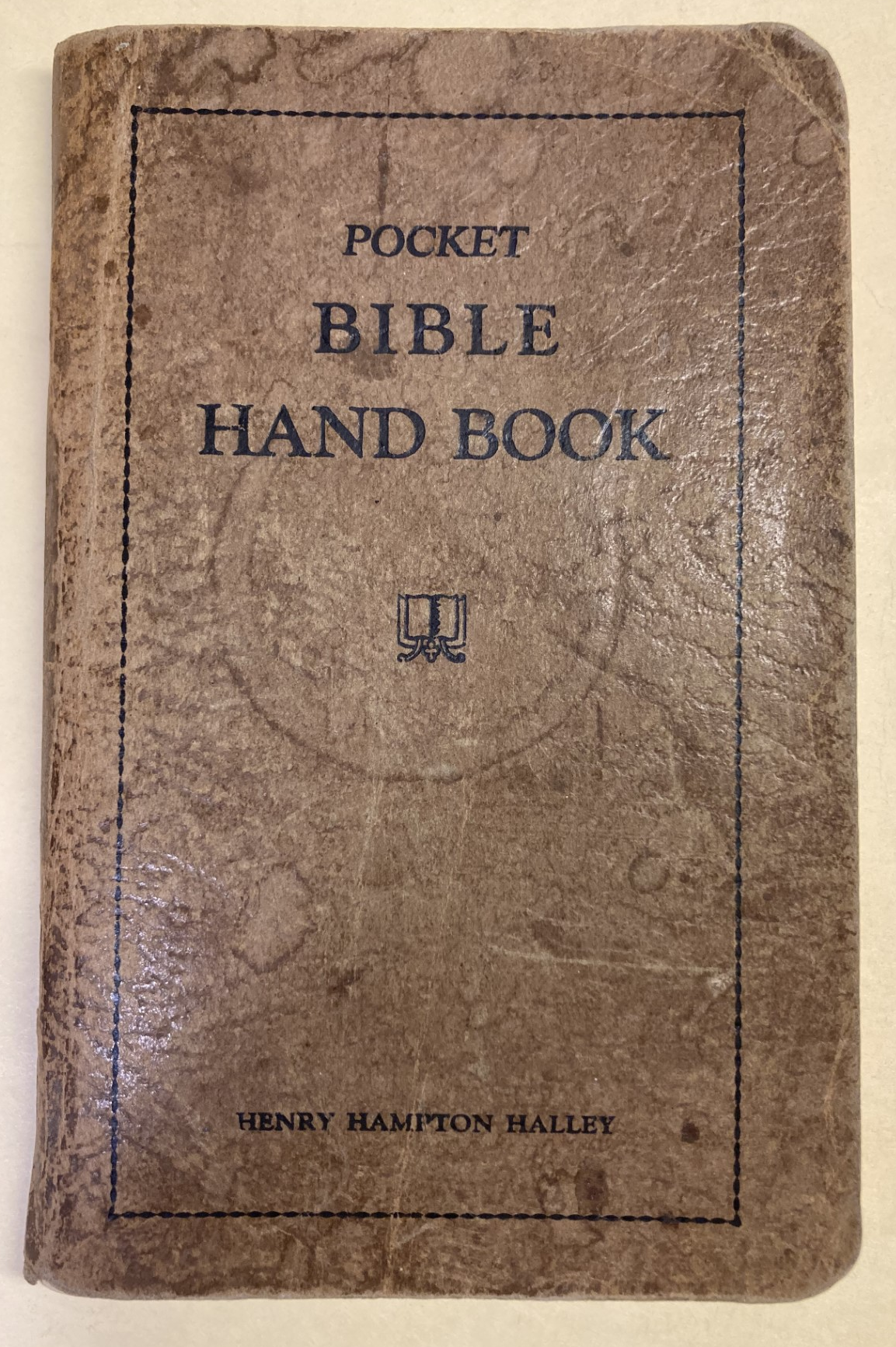
1932 edition of Bible Handbook, 160 pages.

== Early life and education ==
Halley was born in Scott County, Kentucky, in 1874, and graduated from Transylvania University and the College of the Bible in 1895. Halley's career as a preacher began in 1899.

== Career ==
Halley began his Bible Handbook in 1924, at which point it was only a 16-page pamphlet of introductory material, called "Suggestions for Bible Study". After Halley distributed 10,000 free copies, he published a second edition that had grown to 32 pages. Each edition saw growth and Halley did not charge until it reached 100 pages. Until 1941, Halley supported his ministry and his publications through donations. During World War II, Halley stopped travelling to preach and put together his Bible handbook: "An Abbreviated Bible Commentary, Amazing Archaeological Discoveries, How We Got the Bible, An Epitome of Church History, Select Bible Verses." It was printed by Rand McNally. When the publication rights were transferred to Zondervan in 1960, the handbook had already sold over 5 million copies.

For over 10 years, he spent at least 10,000 hours memorizing scripture. He could recite a total of 25 hours of scripture, including narratives of every book from the longest to the shortest.

== Honors and awards ==
Halley was presented the Chicago Bible Society's Gutenberg Award in 1961.

== Personal life ==
He married Margaret "Madge" Alberta Gillie and they had four children.
