= Proverbs 30 =

Penultimate chapter of the biblical book of Proverbs

- ← chapter 29 chapter 31 →
- The whole Book of Proverbs in the Leningrad Codex (1008 C.E.) from an old facsimile edition.
- Book: Book of Proverbs
- Category: Ketuvim
- Christian Bible part: Old Testament
- Order in the Christian part: 21

Proverbs 30 is the 30th chapter of the Book of Proverbs in the Hebrew Bible or the Old Testament of the Christian Bible. The book is a compilation of several wisdom literature collections, with the heading in Proverbs 1:1 may be intended to regard Solomon as the traditional author of the whole book, but the dates of the individual collections are difficult to determine, and the book probably obtained its final shape in the post-exilic period. This chapter first records "the sayings of Agur", followed by a collection of epigrams and aphorisms.

== Text ==
=== Hebrew ===
The following table shows the Hebrew text of Proverbs 30 with vowels alongside an English translation based upon the JPS 1917 translation (now in the public domain).

Verse	Hebrew	English translation (JPS 1917)
1	דִּבְרֵ֤י ׀ אָג֥וּר בִּן־יָקֶ֗ה הַמַּ֫שָּׂ֥א נְאֻ֣ם הַ֭גֶּבֶר לְאִֽיתִיאֵ֑ל לְאִ֖יתִיאֵ֣ל וְאֻכָֽל׃	The words of Agur the son of Jakeh; the burden. The man saith unto Ithiel, unto Ithiel and Ucal:
2	כִּ֤י בַ֣עַר אָנֹכִ֣י מֵאִ֑ישׁ וְלֹֽא־בִינַ֖ת אָדָ֣ם לִֽי׃	Surely I am brutish, unlike a man, And have not the understanding of a man;
3	וְלֹֽא־לָמַ֥דְתִּי חׇכְמָ֑ה וְדַ֖עַת קְדֹשִׁ֣ים אֵדָֽע׃	And I have not learned wisdom, That I should have the knowledge of the Holy One.
4	מִ֤י עָלָֽה־שָׁמַ֨יִם ׀ וַיֵּרַ֡ד מִ֤י אָֽסַף־ר֨וּחַ ׀ בְּחׇפְנָ֡יו מִ֤י צָֽרַר־מַ֨יִם ׀ בַּשִּׂמְלָ֗ה מִ֭י הֵקִ֣ים כׇּל־אַפְסֵי־אָ֑רֶץ מַה־שְּׁמ֥וֹ וּמַֽה־שֶּׁם־בְּ֝נ֗וֹ כִּ֣י תֵדָֽע׃	Who hath ascended up into heaven, and descended? Who hath gathered the wind in his fists? Who hath bound the waters in his garment? Who hath established all the ends of the earth? What is his name, and what is his son's name, if thou knowest?
5	כׇּל־אִמְרַ֣ת אֱל֣וֹהַּ צְרוּפָ֑ה מָגֵ֥ן ה֝֗וּא לַחֹסִ֥ים בּֽוֹ׃	Every word of God is tried; He is a shield unto them that take refuge in Him.
6	אַל־תּ֥וֹסְףְּ עַל־דְּבָרָ֑יו פֶּן־יוֹכִ֖יחַ בְּךָ֣ וְנִכְזָֽבְתָּ׃	Add thou not unto His words, Lest He reprove thee, and thou be found a liar.
7	שְׁ֭תַּיִם שָׁאַ֣לְתִּי מֵאִתָּ֑ךְ אַל־תִּמְנַ֥ע מִ֝מֶּ֗נִּי בְּטֶ֣רֶם אָמֽוּת׃	Two things have I asked of Thee; Deny me them not before I die:
8	שָׁ֤וְא ׀ וּֽדְבַר־כָּזָ֡ב הַרְחֵ֬ק מִמֶּ֗נִּי רֵ֣אשׁ וָ֭עֹשֶׁר אַל־תִּֽתֶּן־לִ֑י הַ֝טְרִיפֵ֗נִי לֶ֣חֶם חֻקִּֽי׃	Remove far from me falsehood and lies; Give me neither poverty nor riches; feed me with mine allotted bread;
9	פֶּ֥ן אֶשְׂבַּ֨ע ׀ וְכִחַשְׁתִּי֮ וְאָמַ֗רְתִּי מִ֥י יְ֫הֹוָ֥ה וּפֶֽן־אִוָּרֵ֥שׁ וְגָנַ֑בְתִּי וְ֝תָפַ֗שְׂתִּי שֵׁ֣ם אֱלֹהָֽי׃	Lest I be full, and deny, and say: ‘Who is the LORD?’ Or lest I be poor, and steal, And profane the name of my God.
10	אַל־תַּלְשֵׁ֣ן עֶ֭בֶד אֶל־אֲדֹנָ֑ו פֶּֽן־יְקַלֶּלְךָ֥ וְאָשָֽׁמְתָּ׃	Slander not a servant unto his master, Lest he curse thee, and thou be found guilty.
11	דּ֭וֹר אָבִ֣יו יְקַלֵּ֑ל וְאֶת־אִ֝מּ֗וֹ לֹ֣א יְבָרֵֽךְ׃	There is a generation that curse their father, And do not bless their mother.
12	דּ֭וֹר טָה֣וֹר בְּעֵינָ֑יו וּ֝מִצֹּאָת֗וֹ לֹ֣א רֻחָֽץ׃	There is a generation that are pure in their own eyes, And yet are not washed from their filthiness.
13	דּ֭וֹר מָה־רָמ֣וּ עֵינָ֑יו וְ֝עַפְעַפָּ֗יו יִנָּשֵֽׂאוּ׃	There is a generation, Oh how lofty are their eyes! And their eyelids are lifted up.
14	דּ֤וֹר ׀ חֲרָב֣וֹת שִׁנָּיו֮ וּֽמַאֲכָל֢וֹת מְֽתַלְּעֹ֫תָ֥יו לֶאֱכֹ֣ל עֲנִיִּ֣ים מֵאֶ֑רֶץ וְ֝אֶבְיוֹנִ֗ים מֵאָדָֽם׃	There is a generation whose teeth are as swords, and their great teeth as knives, To devour the poor from off the earth, and the needy from among men.
15	לַ֥עֲלוּקָ֨ה ׀ שְׁתֵּ֥י בָנוֹת֮ הַ֤ב ׀ הַ֥֫ב שָׁל֣וֹשׁ הֵ֭נָּה לֹ֣א תִשְׂבַּ֑עְנָה אַ֝רְבַּ֗ע לֹא־אָ֥מְרוּ הֽוֹן׃	The horseleech hath two daughters: ‘Give, give.’ There are three things that are never satisfied, Yea, four that say not: ‘Enough’:
16	שְׁאוֹל֮ וְעֹ֢צֶ֫ר רָ֥חַם אֶ֭רֶץ לֹא־שָׂ֣בְעָה מַּ֑יִם וְ֝אֵ֗שׁ לֹא־אָ֥מְרָה הֽוֹן׃	The grave; and the barren womb; The earth that is not satisfied with water; And the fire that saith not: ‘Enough.’
17	עַ֤יִן ׀ תִּ֥לְעַ֣ג לְאָב֮ וְתָבֻ֢ז לִֽיקְּהַ֫ת־אֵ֥ם יִקְּר֥וּהָ עֹֽרְבֵי־נַ֑חַל וְֽיֹאכְל֥וּהָ בְנֵי־נָֽשֶׁר׃	The eye that mocketh at his father, And despiseth to obey his mother, The ravens of the valley shall pick it out, And the young vultures shall eat it.
18	שְׁלֹשָׁ֣ה הֵ֭מָּה נִפְלְא֣וּ מִמֶּ֑נִּי (וארבע) [וְ֝אַרְבָּעָ֗ה] לֹ֣א יְדַעְתִּֽים׃	There are three things which are too wonderful for me, Yea, four which I know not:
19	דֶּ֤רֶךְ הַנֶּ֨שֶׁר ׀ בַּשָּׁמַיִם֮ דֶּ֥רֶךְ נָחָ֗שׁ עֲלֵ֫י־צ֥וּר דֶּֽרֶךְ־אֳנִיָּ֥ה בְלֶב־יָ֑ם וְדֶ֖רֶךְ גֶּ֣בֶר בְּעַלְמָֽה׃	The way of an eagle in the air; The way of a serpent upon a rock; The way of a ship in the midst of the sea; And the way of a man with a young woman.
20	כֵּ֤ן ׀ דֶּ֥רֶךְ אִשָּׁ֗ה מְנָ֫אָ֥פֶת אָ֭כְלָה וּמָ֣חֲתָה פִ֑יהָ וְ֝אָמְרָ֗ה לֹא־פָעַ֥לְתִּי אָֽוֶן׃	So is the way of an adulterous woman; She eateth, and wipeth her mouth, And saith: ‘I have done no wickedness.’
21	תַּ֣חַת שָׁ֭לוֹשׁ רָ֣גְזָה אֶ֑רֶץ וְתַ֥חַת אַ֝רְבַּ֗ע לֹא־תוּכַ֥ל שְׂאֵֽת׃	For three things the earth doth quake, And for four it cannot endure:
22	תַּֽחַת־עֶ֭בֶד כִּ֣י יִמְל֑וֹךְ וְ֝נָבָ֗ל כִּ֣י יִֽשְׂבַּֽע־לָֽחֶם׃	For a servant when he reigneth; And a churl when he is filled with food;
23	תַּ֣חַת שְׂ֭נוּאָה כִּ֣י תִבָּעֵ֑ל וְ֝שִׁפְחָ֗ה כִּֽי־תִירַ֥שׁ גְּבִרְתָּֽהּ׃	For an odious woman when she is married; And a handmaid that is heir to her mistress.
24	אַרְבָּ֣עָה הֵ֭ם קְטַנֵּי־אָ֑רֶץ וְ֝הֵ֗מָּה חֲכָמִ֥ים מְחֻכָּמִֽים׃	There are four things which are little upon the earth, But they are exceeding wise:
25	הַ֭נְּמָלִים עַ֣ם לֹא־עָ֑ז וַיָּכִ֖ינוּ בַקַּ֣יִץ לַחְמָֽם׃	The ants are a people not strong, Yet they provide their food in the summer;
26	שְׁ֭פַנִּים עַ֣ם לֹא־עָצ֑וּם וַיָּשִׂ֖ימוּ בַסֶּ֣לַע בֵּיתָֽם׃	The rock-badgers are but a feeble folk, Yet make they their houses in the crags;
27	מֶ֭לֶךְ אֵ֣ין לָאַרְבֶּ֑ה וַיֵּצֵ֖א חֹצֵ֣ץ כֻּלּֽוֹ׃	The locusts have no king, Yet go they forth all of them by bands;
28	שְׂ֭מָמִית בְּיָדַ֣יִם תְּתַפֵּ֑שׂ וְ֝הִ֗יא בְּהֵ֣יכְלֵי מֶֽלֶךְ׃	The spider thou canst take with the hands, Yet is she in kings’ palaces.
29	שְׁלֹשָׁ֣ה הֵ֭מָּה מֵיטִ֣יבֵי צָ֑עַד וְ֝אַרְבָּעָ֗ה מֵיטִ֥בֵי לָֽכֶת׃	There are three things which are stately in their march, Yea, four which are stately in going:
30	לַ֭יִשׁ גִּבּ֣וֹר בַּבְּהֵמָ֑ה וְלֹא־יָ֝שׁ֗וּב מִפְּנֵי־כֹֽל׃	The lion, which is mightiest among beasts, And turneth not away for any;
31	זַרְזִ֣יר מׇתְנַ֣יִם אוֹ־תָ֑יִשׁ וּ֝מֶ֗לֶךְ אַלְק֥וּם עִמּֽוֹ׃	The greyhound; the he-goat also; And the king, against whom there is no rising up.
32	אִם־נָבַ֥לְתָּ בְהִתְנַשֵּׂ֑א וְאִם־זַ֝מּ֗וֹתָ יָ֣ד לְפֶֽה׃	If thou hast done foolishly in lifting up thyself, Or if thou hast planned devices, lay thy hand upon thy mouth.
33	כִּ֤י מִ֪יץ חָלָ֡ב י֘וֹצִ֤יא חֶמְאָ֗ה וּֽמִיץ־אַ֭ף י֣וֹצִיא דָ֑ם וּמִ֥יץ אַ֝פַּ֗יִם י֣וֹצִיא רִֽיב׃	For the churning of milk bringeth forth curd, And the wringing of the nose bringeth forth blood; So the forcing of wrath bringeth forth strife.

=== Textual witnesses ===
Some early manuscripts containing the text of this chapter in Hebrew are of the Masoretic Text, which includes the Aleppo Codex (10th century), and Codex Leningradensis (1008).

There is also a translation into Koine Greek known as the Septuagint, made in the last few centuries BC. Extant ancient manuscripts of the Septuagint version include Codex Vaticanus (B; $\mathfrak{G}$^{B}; 4th century), Codex Sinaiticus (S; BHK: $\mathfrak{G}$^{S}; 4th century), and Codex Alexandrinus (A; $\mathfrak{G}$^{A}; 5th century).

== Structure ==
Michael Fox, an American biblical scholar, divides this chapter into sections:

- Proverbs 30:1–9 = The Words of Agur
- Proverbs 30:10–33 = Epigrams and Aphorisms
  - Proverbs 30:10 = Aphorism a – Denouncing a Slave
  - Proverbs 30:11–14 = Epigrams i – The Wicked Generation
  - Proverbs 30:15a = Aphorism b – The Epitome of Greed
  - Proverbs 30:15b–16 = Epigrams ii – Four Greedy Things
  - Proverbs 30:17 = Aphorism c – Contempt for Parents
  - Proverbs 30:18–20 = Epigrams iii – Four Wondrous Ways-and One More
  - Proverbs 30:21–23 = Epigrams iv – Four Things That Shake the Earth
  - Proverbs 30:24–28 = Epigrams v – Four Creatures Small but Wise
  - Proverbs 30:29–31 = Epigrams vi – Four Creatures with a Stately Gait
  - Proverbs 30:32–33 = Epigrams vii – Churning Up Quarrels

== Words of Agur (30:1–9) ==
This collection is ascribed to an unknown non-Israelite sage (cf. also 31:1). Fox suggests that it could have been appended to Proverbs because of its valuable cautionary comments and the exaltation of the Torah. The closeness 'in word and spirit' to Psalm 73 is noted as Agur, like the psalmist, combines confession of ignorance with a profession of faith and exultation in the insight that comes from God alone, while urging people to turn directly to God as a safeguard against temptation.

Aberdeen theologian Kenneth Aitken notes that Agur's sayings may not extend beyond verse 14, as the first 14 verses are separate from verses 15 onwards in the Septuagint, but also comments that "opinion is divided on whether they end before verse 14" (possible at verses 4, 6, or 9). The editors of the New American Bible, Revised Edition, suggest that the "original literary unit" probably consisted of verses 1 to 6.

After the collection of most of the sayings in the book of Proverbs have been listed, Agur the collector is tired not unlike the ending of Ecclesiastes. "And further, by these, my son, be admonished: of making many books there is no end; and much study is a weariness of the flesh." Ecclesiastes 12:12.

=== Verse 1 ===
The words of Agur the son of Jakeh, the oracle.
The man declares to Ithiel,

to Ithiel and Ukal:

- "The oracle" translates the Hebrew word massa, which could describe the sayings as a prophetic type 'revelation' (cf. Habakkuk 1:1), but here may designate 'the tribe or place of Massa in northern Arabia' (Genesis 25:14) to which Agur could belong (RSV).
- "To Ithiel, to Ithiel and Ukal" (KJV: "unto Ithiel, even unto Ithiel and Ucal"; ESV: "I am weary, O God; I am weary, O God, and worn out") : these names can presumably be Agur's sons or disciples.

=== Verse 2 ===
Surely I am more brutish than any man, and have not the understanding of a man.

- "Brutish" (בַ֣עַר, ḇa-‘ar) this Hebrew word is also used in Psalm 73:22 and translated as "foolish".

=== Verse 4 ===
Who has ascended up into heaven, or descended?

Who has gathered the wind in his fists?

Who has bound the waters in a garment?

Who has established all the ends of the earth?

What is His name, and what is the name of His son,

if you know?

Like those in Job 38–41, these rhetorical questions emphasize "the inscrutability of God's ways".

Agur raises a question “Who shall go into heaven and come down” in Proverbs 30:4 and it is answered in the New Testament by Christ's in His discourse with Nicodemus in John 3:13 In John 3:13, Jesus states, "No one has ascended into heaven except he who descended from heaven, the Son of Man."

Proverbs 30:4 is also alluded to in the epistles several places. Romans 10:6-7 emphasizes that righteousness comes through faith in Christ's work, not human effort to ascend or descend. Ephesians 4:9-10 highlights Christ's descent to earth and ascent to heaven, fulfilling God's sovereign plan over all creation, echoing the mystery in Proverbs 30:4

=== Verses 5–6 ===
Every word of God is tested;
he is a shield to those who take refuge in him.
Add nothing to his words,
lest he reprimand you, and you be proved a liar.

The editors of the New American Bible, Revised Edition, suggest that the original Agur text probably ended with these verses, because the first six verses reflect a single contrast between human fragility (and ignorance) and divine power (and knowledge).

== Epigrams and aphorisms (30:10–33) ==
This part contains various epigrams and three short aphorisms in the midst. Most of the epigrams (similar to 6:1–19) take the form of lists. Epigrams i and vii contain unnumbered lists whose items are grouped by theme and anaphora (each line starts with the same word). Epigram v is a single-number list with four items. Epigrams ii, iii, iv, and vi are numerical proverbs, in the form "Three things … and four". The final item in the series is usually the climax and focal point.

=== Verse 14 ===
There is a generation, whose teeth are as swords, and their jaw teeth as knives, to devour the poor from off the earth, and the needy from among men.

- "Knives": from Hebrew: ma'akhelet, "meat-cleavers", also used in the story of the Binding of Isaac, are 'not ordinary knives but the kind used to butcher meat'.

=== Verse 15 ===
The leech has two daughters,
crying, "Give, give."
There are three things that are never satisfied,
indeed, four things never say, "It is enough".

- "The leech has two daughters": implying a greedy person, or likely 'a greedy woman', because the Hebrew word for "leech" is a feminine noun. The "two daughters" is seen as 'a reference to the two suckers of the leech'.
- "Three things...four": Compare to Amos 1:3: "For three transgressions of Damascus, and for four, I will not turn away the punishment thereof."
- The whole verse 15 can be translated differently. The Hebrew word for leach is "Aluka", can also be a person name, which wrote at least the two verses 15-16 and verse 15 will be translated so: "Aluka is saying: Two daughters (says) give give The third never satisfied, The fourth never say it is enough" If so, verse 16 is explain for verse 15 (details about the daughters)

=== Verse 16 ===
the grave, the barren womb,
the earth that is not filled with water,
and the fire that never says, “It is enough.”

- "The grave": or "Sheol" is 'never sated with the dead, always wanting more' (cf. 1:12); is placed in a parallelism (in an ironic antithesis) with a blocked womb, which is 'never satisfied with its condition of barrenness, always hungry to produce life' (cf. Genesis 3:1) also like the desire of the earth for water, and the fire for fuel (cf. Amos 7:4).

=== Verse 31 ===
A greyhound; an he goat also; and a king, against whom there is no rising up.

- "A greyhound": or "strutting rooster" (NKJV); is literally 'one girt of loins' or 'girded of waist', i.e. 'the strutter', usually taken with the LXX as referring to the cock, though other animals such as the warhorse have been proposed.
- "A king against whom there is no uprising": according to a Jewish tradition, or "a king whose troops are with him" in NKJV.

== See also ==
- Ant
- Locust
- Related Bible parts: Job 38, Job 39, Job 40, Job 41, Psalm 73, Amos 1

== Sources ==
- Aitken, K. T. (2007). "19. Proverbs". In Barton, John; Muddiman, John (eds.). The Oxford Bible Commentary (first (paperback) ed.). Oxford University Press. pp. 405–422. ISBN 978-0199277186.
- Alter, Robert (2010). The Wisdom Books: Job, Proverbs, and Ecclesiastes: A Translation with Commentary. W.W. Norton & Co. ISBN 978-0393080735.
- Coogan, Michael David (2007). Coogan, Michael David; Brettler, Marc Zvi; Newsom, Carol Ann; Perkins, Pheme (eds.). The New Oxford Annotated Bible with the Apocryphal/Deuterocanonical Books: New Revised Standard Version, Issue 48 (Augmented 3rd ed.). Oxford University Press. ISBN 9780195288810.
- Fox, Michael V. (2009). Proverbs 10-31: A New Translation with Introduction and Commentary. Anchor Yale Bible Commentaries. Yale University Press. ISBN 978-0300155563.
- Halley, Henry H. (1965). Halley's Bible Handbook: an abbreviated Bible commentary (24th (revised) ed.). Zondervan Publishing House. ISBN 0-310-25720-4.
- Würthwein, Ernst (1995). The Text of the Old Testament. Translated by Rhodes, Erroll F. Grand Rapids, MI: Wm. B. Eerdmans. ISBN 0-8028-0788-7.
