= Job 41 =

41st chapter of the Book of Job in the Bible

- ← chapter 40 chapter 42 →
- The whole Book of Job in the Leningrad Codex (1008 A.D.) from an old facsimile edition.
- Book: Book of Job
- Hebrew Bible part: Ketuvim
- Order in the Hebrew part: 3
- Category: Sifrei Emet
- Christian Bible part: Old Testament
- Order in the Christian part: 18

Job 41 is the 41st chapter of the book of Job in the Hebrew Bible or the Old Testament of the Christian Bible. The book is anonymous; most scholars believe it was written around 6th century BCE This chapter records the speech of God to Job, which belongs to the "Verdicts" section of the book, comprising Job 32:1–42:6.

== Text ==
The original text is written in Hebrew language. This chapter is divided into 34 verses in English Bibles, but only 26 verses in Hebrew Bible using a different verse numbering (see below).

=== Verse numbering ===
There are some differences in verse numbering of this chapter in English Bibles and Hebrew texts:

English	Hebrew
41:1–8	40:25–32
41:9–34	41:1–26

This article generally follows the common numbering in Christian English Bible versions, with notes to the numbering in Hebrew Bible versions.

=== Textual witnesses ===
Some early manuscripts containing the text of this chapter in Hebrew are of the Masoretic Text, which includes the Aleppo Codex (10th century), and Codex Leningradensis (1008).

There is also a translation into Koine Greek known as the Septuagint, made in the last few centuries BCE; some extant ancient manuscripts of this version include Codex Vaticanus (B; $\mathfrak{G}$^{B}; 4th century), Codex Sinaiticus (S; BHK: $\mathfrak{G}$^{S}; 4th century), and Codex Alexandrinus (A; $\mathfrak{G}$^{A}; 5th century).

== Analysis ==
The structure of the book is as follows:

- The Prologue (chapters 1–2)
- The Dialogue (chapters 3–31)
- The Verdicts (32:1–42:6)
- The Epilogue (42:7–17)

Within the structure, chapter 41 is grouped into the Verdict section with the following outline:

- Elihu's Verdict (32:1–37:24)
- God's Appearance (Yahweh Speeches) and Job's Responses (38:1–42:6)
  - God's First Speech (38:1–40:2)
    - Theme Verse and Summons (38:1–3)
    - The Physical World (38:4–38)
    - The Physical Earth (38:4–7)
    - The Sea (38:8–11)
    - The Morning (38:12–15)
    - The Outer Limits of the Earth (38:16–18)
    - Light and Darkness (38:19–21)
    - The Waters – Snow, Hail, Rain, Frost, Ice (38:22–30)
    - The Heavenly Bodies (38:31–33)
    - Storms (38:34–38)
  - The Animal World (38:39–40:2)
    - God Provides for the Lions and Ravens (38:39–41)
    - The Mountain Goats (39:1–4)
    - The Wild Donkey (39:5–8)
    - The Wild Ox (39:9–12)
    - The Ostrich (39:13–18)
    - The Warhorse (39:19–25)
      - The Hawk and the Eagle (39:26–30)
    - Brief Challenge to Answer (40:1–2)
  - Job's First Reply – An Insufficient Response (40:3–5)
  - God's Second Speech (40:6–41:34)
    - Theme Verse and Summons (40:6–8)
    - The Challenge Expanded (40:9–14)
    - The Challenge of Controlling Behemoth (40:15–24)
    - Leviathan (41:1–34)
      - The Challenge to Contend with Leviathan (41:1–7)
      - Some Conclusions (41:8–11)
      - His Armor (41:12–17)
      - His Breathing. of Fire (41:18–21)
      - His Strength (41:22–25)
      - Weapons Cannot Defeat Him (41:26–29)
      - He Creates Turmoil (41:30–32)
      - Conclusion (41:33–34)
  - Job's Second Reply (42:1–6)

God's speeches in chapters 38–41 can be split into two parts, both starting with almost identical phrases and having a similar structure:

First speech	Second speech
A. Introductory formula (38:1)	A1. Introductory formula (40:6)
B. Thematic challenge (38:2–3) i. Theme A (key verse – verse 2) ii. Summons (verse 3)	B1. Thematic challenge (40:7–14) i. Summons (verse 7) ii. Theme B (key verse – verse 8) iii. Challenge expanded (verses 9–14)
C, Particularization of theme i. In the physical world (38:4–38) ii. In the animal and bird kingdoms (38:39–39:30)	C1, Particularization of theme i. With Behemoth (40:15–24) ii. With Leviathan (41:1–34)
D. Brief Challenge to Answer (40:1–2)

The revelation of the Lord to Job is the culmination of the book of Job, that the Lord speaks directly to Job and displays his sovereign power and glory. Job has lived through the suffering—without cursing God, holding his integrity, and nowhere regretted it – but he was unaware of the real reason for his suffering, so God intervenes to resolve the spiritual issues that surfaced. Job was not punished for sin and Job's suffering had not cut him off from God, now Job sees the end the point that he cannot have the knowledge to make the assessments he made, so it is wiser to bow in submission and adoration of God than to try to judge him.

Chapter 41 continues YHWH's second speech with the focus on the sea creature Leviathan. The chapters consists of two sections:

1. A challenge to Job to contend with Leviathan (verses 1–11)
2. An extended description of Leviathan's features (verses 12–34)

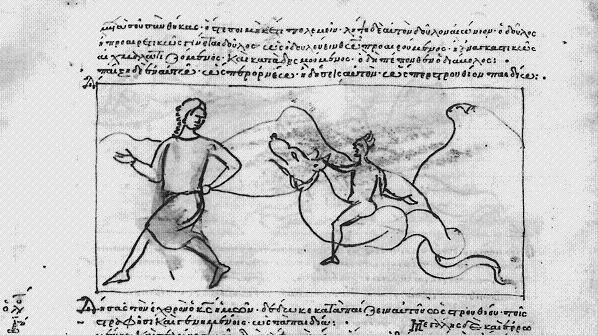
Book of Job in Illuminated Byzantine Manuscripts with Cyclic Illustration (AD 1200). Biblioteca Apostolica Vaticana, Rome.

== God challenges Job to contend with Leviathan (41:1–11) ==
The section opens with a series of questions to challenge Job to contend with Leviathan, which is quite overpowering for humans. The human challenge against Leviathan is described as futile (verses 8–10a), so the implication is "who can stand before" YHWH who created Leviathan (verse 10b).

=== Verse 1 ===
[YHWH said:] "Can you draw out Leviathan with a hook,

Or snare his tongue with a line which you lower?"

- "Leviathan": a large sea creature with unknown exact identity. It is referenced in Psalm 74:14; 104:26; Isaiah 27:1). The defeat of Satan in Revelation 12:3–9 is depicted with the same kind of imagery as Leviathan.
- "Draw out": translated from the Hebrew verb מָשַׁךְ, mashakh, meaning "to extract from the water; to fish".
- "Lower": translated from the Hebrew verb שָׁקַע, shaqaʿ, meaning "to cause to sink", if it is connected with the word in Amos 8:8 and 9:5. It may also have the sense of "to tie; to bind", that is 'using rope to put (bind tightly) around the tongue and jaw'.

== God speaks more of Leviathan (41:12–34) ==
After an introductory statement (verse 12), God speaks more extensively on the Leviathan: its armor (verses 13–17), fire breathing (verses 18–21), strength (verses 22–25), inability of weapons to defeat it (verses 26–29), the turmoil it creates (verses 30–32) and a general conclusion (verses 33–34). It is out of the question for humans to control this creature (whether natural or symbolic of the forces of evil and chaos), but it needs to be controlled for the creation to continue and God has the control of it and all the creatures to order the world. Therefore, God's rule is more than Job can imagine and more nuanced than simply rewarding righteousness or punishing wickedness.

=== Verse 22 ===
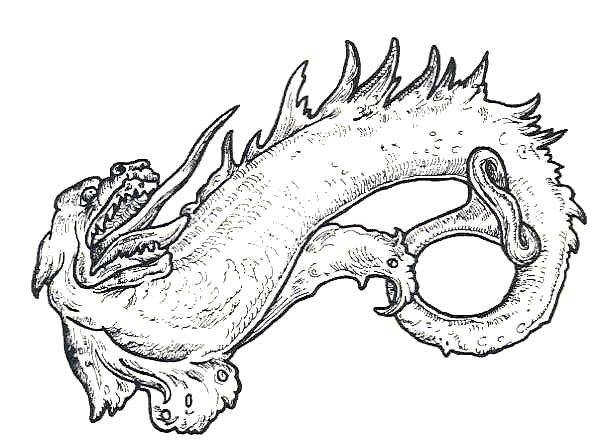
Illustration of Leviathan from the Medieval grimoires.

[YHWH said:] "In his neck abides strength,

and terror dances before him."

- "Terror": translated from the Hebrew word דְּאָבָה, deʾavah, which is only found here in the whole Hebrew Bible, but the verbal root means "to languish; to pine" and a related noun talk of "dejection and despair" in Deuteronomy 28:65.

== See also ==
- Leviathan
- Millstone
- Scale (zoology)
- Related Bible parts: Job 38, Job 39, Job 40, Psalm 74, Psalm 104, Isaiah 27

== Sources ==
- Alter, Robert (2010). The Wisdom Books: Job, Proverbs, and Ecclesiastes: A Translation with Commentary. W.W. Norton & Co. ISBN 978-0393080735.
- Coogan, Michael David (2007). Coogan, Michael David; Brettler, Marc Zvi; Newsom, Carol Ann; Perkins, Pheme (eds.). The New Oxford Annotated Bible with the Apocryphal/Deuterocanonical Books: New Revised Standard Version, Issue 48 (Augmented 3rd ed.). Oxford University Press. ISBN 9780195288810.
- Crenshaw, James L. (2007). "17. Job". In Barton, John; Muddiman, John (eds.). The Oxford Bible Commentary (first (paperback) ed.). Oxford University Press. pp. 331–355. ISBN 978-0199277186.
- Estes, Daniel J. (2013). Walton, John H.; Strauss, Mark L. (eds.). Job. Teach the Text Commentary Series. United States: Baker Publishing Group. ISBN 9781441242778.
- Farmer, Kathleen A. (1998). "The Wisdom Books". In McKenzie, Steven L.; Graham, Matt Patrick (eds.). The Hebrew Bible Today: An Introduction to Critical Issues. Westminster John Knox Press. ISBN 978-0-66425652-4.
- Halley, Henry H. (1965). Halley's Bible Handbook: an abbreviated Bible commentary (24th (revised) ed.). Zondervan Publishing House. ISBN 0-310-25720-4.
- Kugler, Robert; Hartin, Patrick J. (2009). An Introduction to the Bible. Eerdmans. ISBN 978-0-8028-4636-5.
- Walton, John H. (2012). Job. United States: Zondervan. ISBN 9780310492009.
- Wilson, Lindsay (2015). Job. United States: Wm. B. Eerdmans Publishing Company. ISBN 9781467443289.
- Würthwein, Ernst (1995). The Text of the Old Testament. Translated by Rhodes, Erroll F. Grand Rapids, MI: Wm. B. Eerdmans. ISBN 0-8028-0788-7.
