= Agur =

Biblical sage

Agur ben Jakeh (Hebrew: אָגוּר בִּן־יָקֶה, romanized: ʾĀgūr bīn-Yāqe) was a sage and a compiler of a collection of proverbs found in Proverbs 30, which is sometimes known as the Book of Agur or Sayings of Agur.

== Biblical accounts ==
The initial text of the chapter runs as follows (JPS translation), and bears great similarity to Isaiah 40:12–14. This translation is not universally accepted as correct; see below.

The words of Agur son of Jakeh, [man of] Massa (המשא); The speech of the man to Ithiel, to Ithiel and Ucal: "I am brutish, less than a man; I lack common sense. I have not learned wisdom, Nor do I possess knowledge of the Holy One. Who has ascended heaven and come down? Who has gathered up the wind in the hollow of his hand? Who has wrapped the waters in his garment? Who has established all the extremities of the earth? What is his name or his son's name, if you know it?"

— Proverbs 30:1–4

The text (verse 1) seems to say that he was a "Massaite", the gentilic termination not being indicated in the traditional writing "Ha-Massa". This place has been identified by some Assyriologists with the land of Mash, a district between Judea and Babylonia, and the traces of nomadic or semi-nomadic life and thought found in Gen. 31 and 32 give some support to the hypothesis. Heinrich Graetz, followed by Bickell and Cheyne, conjectures that the original reading is המשל ("Ha-Moshel" = "the collector of proverbs"). Even still, the root word maššā denotes something that is carried, and it is used several times in the prophetic books of the Hebrew Bible (Isaiah 14:28, Nahum 1:1, Jer. 23:33, etc.) to describe the words or predictions of prophets. Though Agur is not explicitly called a prophet, this may indicate that maššā is being used to give his words an oracular quality.

== In rabbinical literature ==
"Agur", and the enigmatical names and words which follow in Proverbs 30:1, are interpreted by the Aggadah as epithets of Solomon, playing upon the words as follows: "Agur" denotes "the compiler; the one who first gathered maxims together". "The son of Jakeh" denotes "the one who spat out" or "despised" (from קוא, "to spit"), le-Ithiel, "the words of God" (ot, "word"; El, "God"), exclaiming, "I can [ukal] transgress the law against marrying many wives without fear of being misled by them." (Source for last comment?)

Another interpretation is that "Agur" means "the one who is brave in the pursuit of wisdom"; "the son of Jakeh" signifies "he who is free from sin" (from naki, "pure"); ha-massa ("the burden"), "he who bore the yoke of God"; le-Ithiel, "he who understood the signs" (ot, "sign") and deeds of God, or he who understood the alphabet of God, that is the creative "letters" (ot, "letter"); we-Ukal, "the master".

== Alternate explanations of first verse ==
Some scholars, including Leo Perdue, have considered other meanings for "le-ithiel" and "ukhal". Observing that "it is highly unlikely that the two Hebrew terms refer to personal names" (note that the names Agur and Jakeh are not seen anywhere else in the Bible or any other Israelite document), Perdue points out that some better translations for le-ithiel would be "I am weary, O God"; or: "I am not God". "Ve-ukhal" would complement it: "How can I prevail/I am exhausted?". The highly non-standard Hebrew and the lack of parallel language elsewhere makes it difficult to settle on a particular shade of meaning.

Some have speculated that Agur is a "foreign sage from the East" who is quoted here only to be later rebuked.

Another explanation may be: This is the name of the author of the wise sayings provided in Prov. 30. Either this was a real person, or as some have suggested, it was a fanciful name for Solomon. Proverbs 30 says that he was the son of Jakeh (Hebrew: “Yaqeh”) which means “to obey” or “obedient.” Again, this is either a real person, or another symbolic name for Solomon.

== Status as a prophet of Christianity ==
Agur's question "What is his name or his son's name, if you know it?" in Proverbs 30:4 was interpreted by several Christian authors as one of the allusions in Old Testament to the coming of the Christ, the Son of God. This viewpoint is also expressed in John Witherspoon's "On the Purity of The Heart".

However, Rashi interpreted this verse and the preceding one (Prov. 30:3) as referring to Moses, namely the wisdom of the Torah that Moses knew and understood, and that no prophet had arisen since like Moses.
