= Book of Proverbs =

Book of the Bible

The Book of Proverbs (Hebrew: מִשְלֵי, romanized: Mišlê; Greek: Παροιμίαι, romanized: Paroimiai; Latin: Liber Proverbiorum "Proverbs [of Solomon]") is the second book in the third section of the Hebrew Bible and a book in the Christian Old Testament. It is traditionally ascribed to King Solomon and his students. When translated into Greek and Latin, the title took on different forms: in the Greek Septuagint (LXX), it became Παροιμίαι (Paroimiai, lit. 'Proverbs'); in the Latin Vulgate, the title was Proverbia—from which the English name is derived.

Proverbs is not merely an anthology but a "collection of collections" relating to a pattern of life that lasted for more than a millennium. It is an example of biblical wisdom literature and raises questions about values, moral behavior, the meaning of human life, and right conduct, and its theological foundation is that "the fear of God is the beginning of wisdom." Wisdom is personified and praised for her role in creation; God created her before all else and gave order to chaos through her. As humans have life and prosperity by conforming to the order of creation, seeking wisdom is the essence and goal of life.

The book of Proverbs is divided into sections: the initial invitation to acquire wisdom, another section focused mainly on contrasting the wise and the fool, and the third being moral discourses on various topics. Chapters 25–29 discuss justice, the wicked, and the rich and poor; chapter 30 introduces the "sayings of Agur" on creation and divine power.

Recent research on the book of Proverbs has taken two main approaches. Some scholars argue that different sections of the book originate from various periods, with chapters 1–9 and (30–)31 being the latest and final redaction dated to the late Persian or Hellenistic periods, while others focus on the book's received form, analyzing its overall meaning first.

== Structure ==
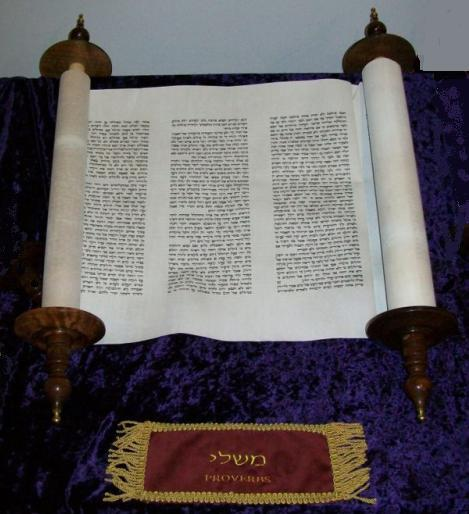
Scroll of the Book of Proverbs

The superscriptions divide the collections as follows:

- Proverbs 1–9: "Proverbs of Solomon, Son of David, King of Israel"
- Proverbs 10–22:16: "Proverbs of Solomon"
- Proverbs 22:17–24:22: "The Sayings of the Wise"
- Proverbs 24:23–34: "These Also are Sayings of the Wise"
- Proverbs 25–29: "These are Other Proverbs of Solomon that the Officials of King Hezekiah of Judah Copied"
- Proverbs 30: "The Words of Agur"
- Proverbs 31:1–9: "The Words of King Lemuel of Massa, (Note: Most translate: "Lemuel, an oracle (masa) which his mother . . .") Which his Mother Taught Him"
- Proverbs 31:10–31: the ideal wise woman (elsewhere called the "woman of substance").

== Contents ==
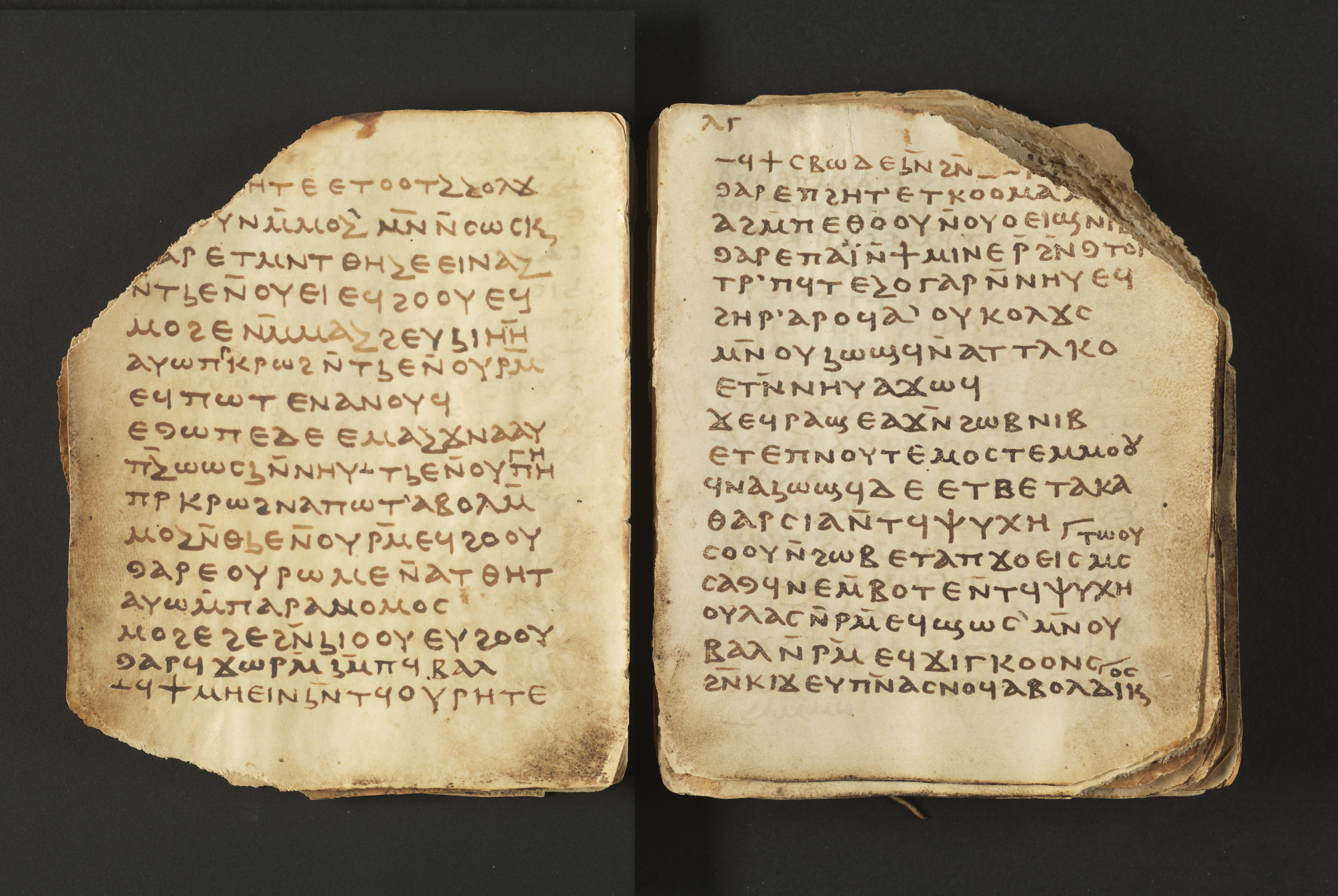
Papyrus Bodmer VI, featuring a Coptic translation of Proverbs (4th/5th century AD)

"Proverb" is a translation of the Hebrew word mashal (מָשָׁל), but mashal has a wider range of meanings than the short, catchy saying implied by the English word. Thus, roughly half the book is made up of "sayings" of this type, while the other half consists of longer poetic units of various types. These include "instructions" formulated as advice from a teacher or parent addressed to a student or child, dramatic personifications of both Wisdom and Folly, and the "words of the wise" sayings, which are longer than the Solomonic "sayings" but shorter and more diverse than the "instructions."

The first section (chapters 1–9) comprises an initial invitation to young men to take up the course of wisdom, ten "instructions", and five poems on personified Woman Wisdom. Verses 1:1–7 constitute an introduction to the whole of this section. Proverbs 10:1–22:16, with 375 sayings, consists of two parts, the first part (10–14) contrasting the wise man and the fool (or the righteous and the wicked), the second (15–22:16) addressing wise and foolish speech. Verse 22:17 opens ‘the words of the wise’, until verse 24:22, with short moral discourses on various subjects. An additional section of sayings which "also belong to the wise" follows in verses 24:23–34. Chapters 25–29, attributed to the editorial activity of "the men of Hezekiah", contrast the just and the wicked and broach the topic of rich and poor. Chapter 30:1–4, the "sayings of Agur", introduces creation, divine power, and human ignorance. Chapter 31, "the sayings of King Lemuel—an inspired utterance his mother taught him", describes a virtuous woman, a wife of noble character.

== Composition ==
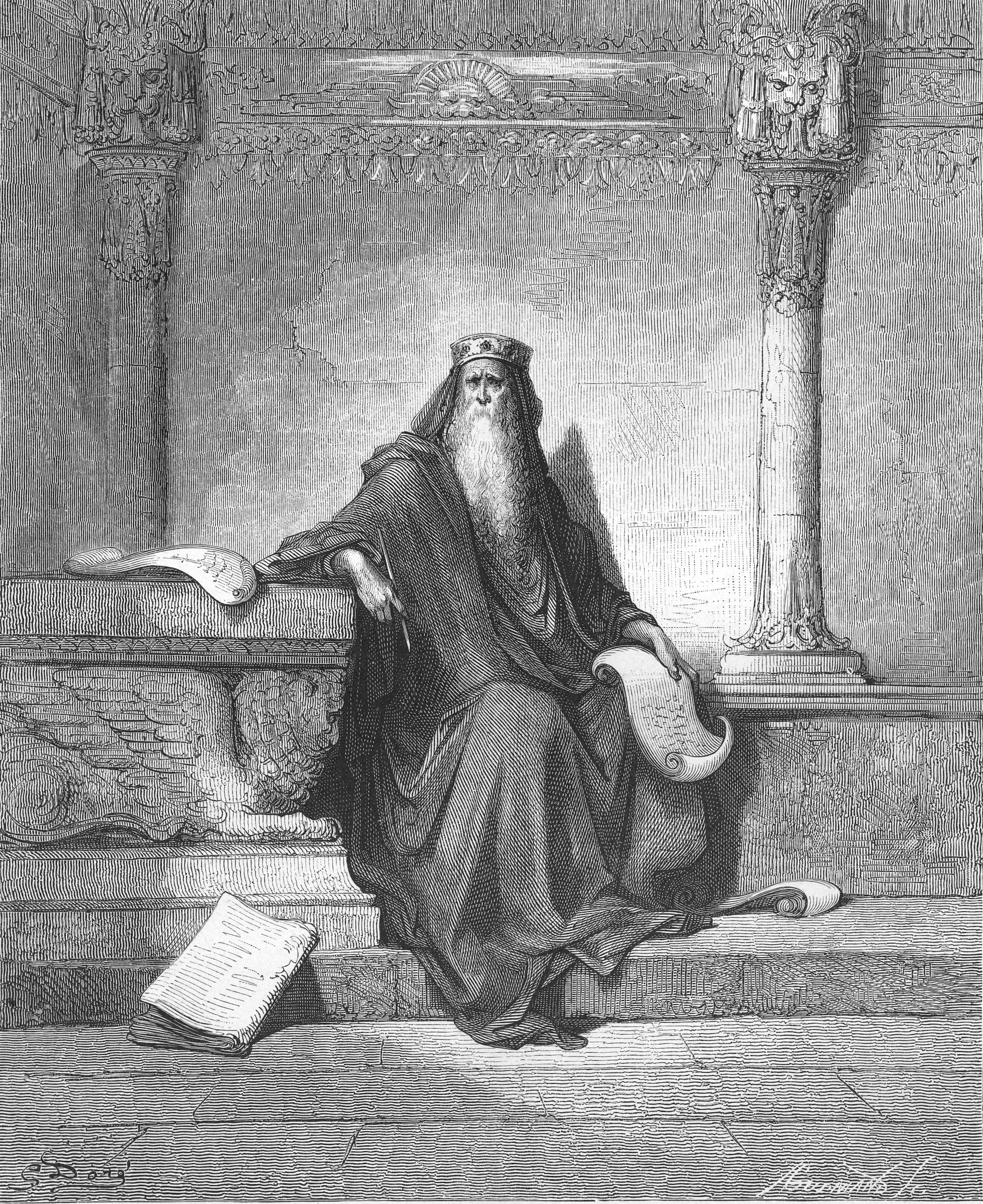
Solomon writing Proverbs (Gustave Doré)

It is impossible to offer precise dates for the sayings in Proverbs, a "collection of collections" relating to a pattern of life that lasted for more than a millennium. The title is traditionally derived from chapter 1:1, Mishlei Sh'lomo (Biblical Hebrew: מִשְׁלֵי שְׁלֹמֹה, romanized: Mišlê Šĕlōmōh, lit. 'Proverbs [of] Solomon'). This phrase is repeated in 10:1 and 25:1, indicating a focus on categorizing the content rather than attributing authorship.

The book is an anthology made up of six discrete units. The Proverbs of Solomon section, chapters 1–9, was probably the last to be composed in the Persian or Hellenistic periods. This section has parallels to prior cuneiform writings. The second, chapters 10–22:16, carries the superscription "the proverbs of Solomon", which may have encouraged its inclusion in the Hebrew canon. The third unit, 22:17–24:22, is headed "bend your ear and hear the words of the wise". A large part of this section is a recasting of a second-millennium BCE Egyptian work entitled the Instruction of Amenemope, and may have reached the Hebrew author(s) through an Aramaic translation. Chapter 24:23 begins a new section and source with the declaration, "These too are from the wise". The next section, at chapter 25:1, has a superscription that the following proverbs were transcribed "by the men of Hezekiah", indicating at face value that they were collected in the reign of Hezekiah in the late 8th century BCE. Chapters 30 and 31 (the "words of Agur," the "words of Lemuel," and the description of the "ideal" woman and wife) are a set of appendices, quite different in style and emphasis from the previous chapters.

The genre of wisdom literature was widespread throughout the ancient Near East, and reading Proverbs alongside the examples recovered from Egypt and Mesopotamia reveals the common ground shared by international wisdom. The wisdom literature of Israel may have been developed in the family, the royal court, and houses of learning and instruction; nevertheless, the overwhelming impression is of instruction within the family in small villages.

== Themes ==
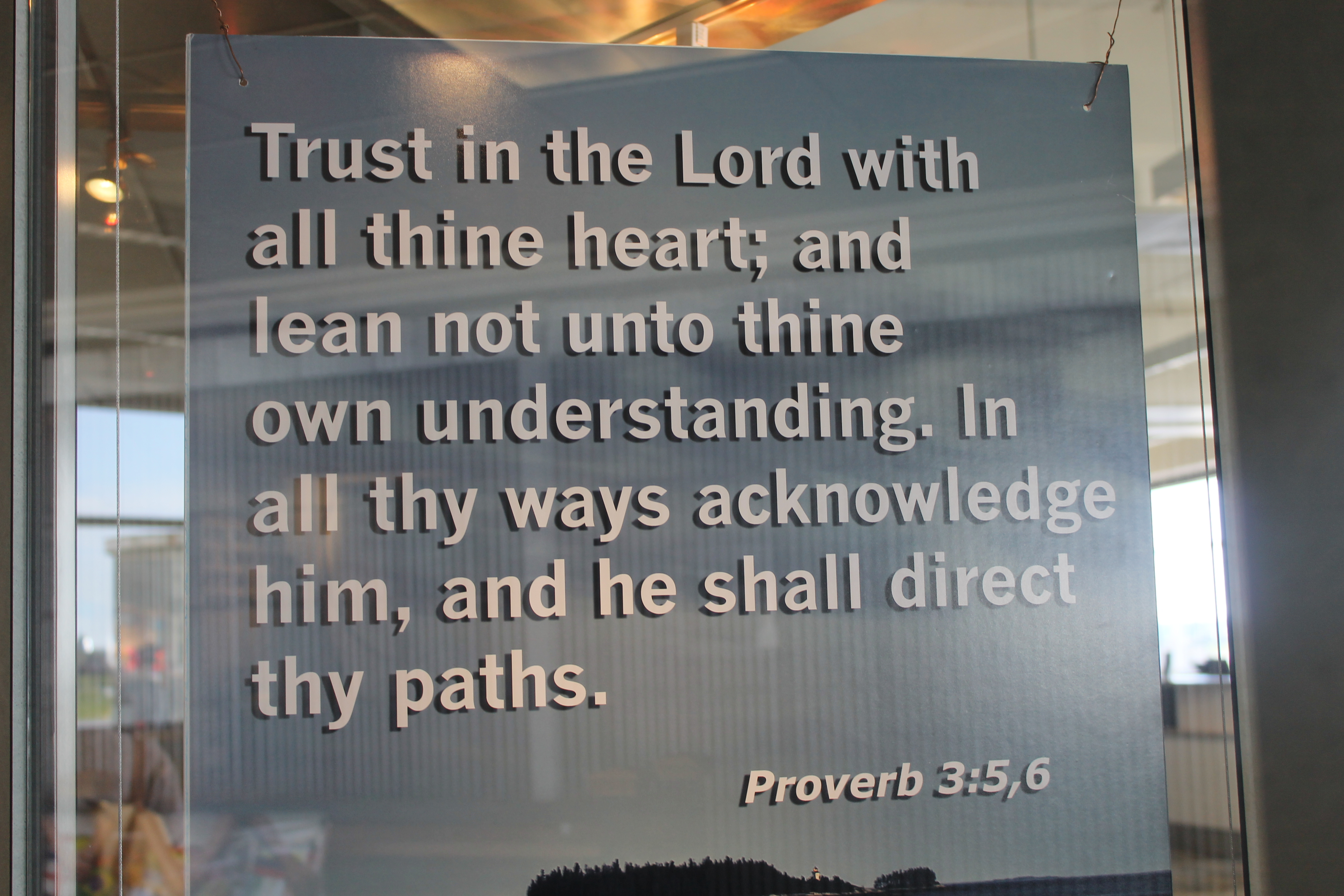
Excerpt from Proverbs 3 displayed at Portland International Jetport in Portland, Maine

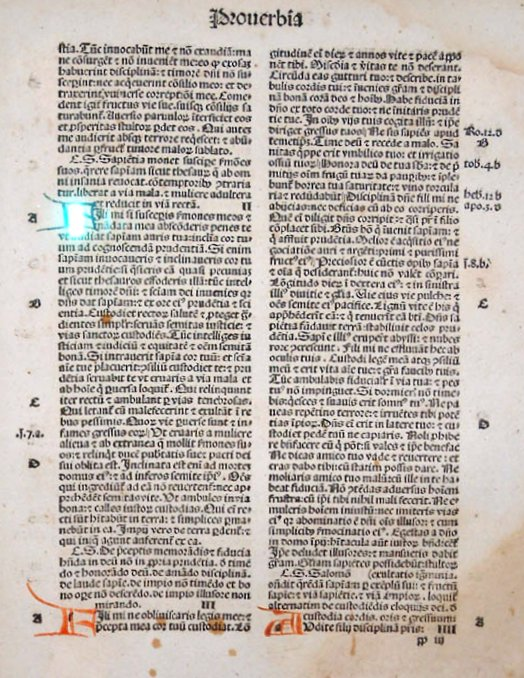
A page of the Book of Proverbs from a Latin Bible from 1497

Along with the other examples of the biblical wisdom tradition – Job and Ecclesiastes and some other writings – Proverbs raises questions of values, moral behavior, the meaning of human life, and righteous conduct. The three retain an ongoing relevance for both religious and secular readers, Job and Ecclesiastes through the boldness of their dissent from received tradition, Proverbs in its worldliness and satiric shrewdness. Wisdom is as close as biblical literature comes to Greek philosophy, of which it was a contemporary; it shares with the Greeks an inquiry into values and reflections on the human condition, although there is no discussion of ontology, epistemology, metaphysics, and the other abstract issues raised by the Greeks.

The rabbinic college almost excluded the Book of Proverbs from the Bible in the late first century. They did this because of its contradictions (the result of the book's origins as not just an anthology but an anthology of anthologies). The reader is told, for example, both to "not answer a fool according to his folly," according to 26:4, and to "answer a fool according to his folly", as 26:5 advises. More pervasively, the recurring theme of the initial unit (chapters 1–9) is that the fear of the Lord is the beginning of wisdom, but the following units are much less theological, presenting wisdom as a transmissible human craft, until with 30:1–14, the "words of Agur," we return once more to the idea that God alone possesses wisdom.

"The fear of God is the beginning of wisdom" (Proverbs 9:10 – the phrase implies submission to God's will). Wisdom is praised for her role in creation ("God by wisdom founded the earth; by understanding, he established the heavens" – Proverbs 3:19). God created her before all else, and through her, he gave order to chaos ("When [God] established the heavens ... when he drew a circle on the face of the Deeps ... when he marked out the foundations of the earth, then I was beside him" – Proverbs 8:27–31). Since humans have life and prosperity by conforming to the order of creation, seeking wisdom is the essence and goal of the religious life. Wisdom, or the wise person, is compared and contrasted with foolishness or the fool, meaning one who is lacking in wisdom and uninterested in instruction, not one who is merely silly or playful (though see the words of Agur for a "fool" who has wisdom and could be seen as playful).

For the most part, Proverbs offers a simplistic view of life with few grey areas: a life lived according to the rules brings reward, and life in violation of them is certain to bring disaster. In contrast, Job and Ecclesiastes appear to be direct contradictions of the simplicities of Proverbs, each in its own way all but dismissing the assumptions of the "wise". Noteworthy also is the fact that the "mighty acts of God" (the Exodus, the giving of the Torah at Sinai, the Covenant between God and Israel, etc.) which make up Israel's history are completely or almost completely absent from Proverbs and the other Wisdom books: in contrast to the other books of the Hebrew Bible, which appeal to divine revelation for their authority ("Thus says the Lord!"), wisdom appeals to human reason and observation.

== Later interpretation and influence ==
Pre-Exilic (i.e., pre-586 BCE) Israelite religion worshipped Yahweh as the supreme deity despite the continued existence of subordinate servant-deities. The post-Exilic writers of the Wisdom tradition developed the idea that Wisdom existed before creation and was used by God to create the universe: "Present from the beginning, Wisdom assumes the role of master builder while God establishes the heavens, restricts the chaotic waters, and shapes the mountains and fields." Borrowing ideas from Greek philosophers who held that Reason bound the universe together, the Wisdom tradition taught that God's Wisdom, Word, and Spirit were the ground of cosmic unity. Christianity, in turn adopted these ideas and applied them to Jesus: the Epistle to the Colossians calls Jesus "... image of the invisible God, first-born of all creation ...", while the Gospel of John identifies him with the creative Word ("In the beginning was the Word, and the Word was with God, and the Word was God").

In the 4th century, when Christianity was caught up in heresies and still developing the creeds that would define its beliefs, Proverbs 8:22 was used both to support and refute the claims of the Arians. The Arians, assuming that Jesus could be equated with the "Wisdom of God" (1 Corinthians 1:24), argued that the Son, like Wisdom, was "created" and therefore subordinate to the Creator. Their opponents, who argued that the relevant Hebrew word should be translated as "begot", won the debate, and the Nicene Creed declared that the Son was "begotten, not made"—meaning that God and Jesus were consubstantial.

== See also ==
- "As a dog returns to his vomit, so a fool repeats his folly"
- Proverbs 30
- Proverbs 31

== Bibliography ==
=== Works cited ===
- Alter, Robert (2010). The Wisdom Books: Job, Proverbs, and Ecclesiastes: A Translation with Commentary. W.W. Norton & Co. ISBN 978-0-39308073-5.
- Berlin, Adele (2011). "Cosmology and creation". In Berlin, Adele; Grossman, Maxine (eds.). The Oxford Dictionary of the Jewish Religion. Oxford University Press. ISBN 978-0-19-973004-9.
- Boccaccini, Gabriele (2002). Roots of Rabbinic Judaism: An Intellectual History, from Ezekiel to Daniel. Eerdmans. ISBN 978-0-80284361-6.
- Clements, Ronald E. (2003). "Proverbs". In Dunn, James D. G.; Rogerson, John William (eds.). Eerdmans Commentary on the Bible. Eerdmans. ISBN 9780802837110.
- Crenshaw, James (2000). "Unresolved Issues in the Wisdom Literature". In Tate, Marvin E.; Ballard, Harold Wayne; Tucker, W. Dennis (eds.). An Introduction to Wisdom Literature and the Psalms. Mercer University Press. ISBN 978-0-86554652-3.
- Farmer, Kathleen A. (1991). Who knows what is good? : a commentary on the Books of Proverbs and Ecclesiastes. Wm. B. Eerdmans Publishing. ISBN 978-0-80280161-6.
- Farmer, Kathleen A. (1998). "The Wisdom Books". In McKenzie, Steven L.; Graham, Matt Patrick (eds.). The Hebrew Bible Today: An Introduction to Critical Issues. Westminster John Knox Press. ISBN 978-0-66425652-4.
- Fox, Michael V. (2000). Proverbs 1–9.
- ——— (2009). Proverbs 10–31. Yale University Press. ISBN 978-0-30015556-3.
- Grabbe, Lester L. (2006). A History of the Jews and Judaism in the Second Temple Period. Vol. 1: The Persian Period (539–331 BCE). Continuum. ISBN 978-0-56704352-8.
- Kaiser, Christopher B. (1997). Creational theology and the history of physical science. Brill. ISBN 90-0410669-3.
- Keown, Gerald (2000). "The Canonical Shape of the Wisdom Literature". In Tate, Marvin E.; Ballard, Harold Wayne; Tucker, W. Dennis (eds.). An Introduction to Wisdom Literature and the Psalms. Mercer University Press. ISBN 978-0-86554652-3.
- Longman, Tremper; Garland, David E. (2009). Proverbs—Isaiah. Zondervan. ISBN 978-0-31059058-3.
- Page Lee, H. (1990). "Council, Heavenly". In Watson E. Mills (ed.). Mercer Dictionary of the Bible. Mercer University Press. ISBN 9780865543737.
- Parrish, V. Steven (1990). "Creation". In Mills, Watson E. (ed.). Mercer Dictionary of the Bible. Mercer University Press. ISBN 9780865543737.
- Perdue, Leo G. (2007). Wisdom Literature: A Theological History. Presbyterian Publishing. ISBN 978-0-66422919-1.
- Perdue, Leo G. (2012). Proverbs. Westminster John Knox Press. ISBN 978-0-66423884-1.
- Sinnott, Alice M. (2005). The Personification of Wisdom. Ashgate Publishing. ISBN 978-0-75465124-6.
- Smothers, Thomas (2000). "Biblical Wisdom in its Ancient Middle Eastern Context". In Tate, Marvin E.; Ballard, Harold Wayne; Tucker, Karl Smith (eds.). An Introduction to Wisdom Literature and the Psalms. Mercer University Press. ISBN 9780865546523.
- Tucker, W. Dennis (2000). "Literary Forms in the Wisdom Literature". In Tate, Marvin E.; Ballard, Harold Wayne; Tucker, W. Dennis (eds.). An Introduction to Wisdom Literature and the Psalms. Mercer University Press. ISBN 978-0-86554652-3.

=== Further reading ===
- Crenshaw, James L. "Book of Proverbs", The Anchor Bible Dictionary, 1992
- Dockery, David S. (general ed.), Holman Bible Handbook, Holman Bible Publishers, Nashville, 1992
- Lasor, William Sanford, Hubbard, David Allan, & Bush, Frederic Wm., Old Testament Survey: The Message, Form, and Background of the Old Testament, 1996
- Murphy, Roland E., Wisdom Literature: Job, Proverbs, Ruth, Canticles, Ecclesiastes, and Esther. Grand Rapids, 1981
- Steinmann, Andrew, "Proverbs 1–9 as a Solomonic Composition", Journal of the Evangelical Theological Society, 43, no. 4
- Waltke, Bruce (2004). Book of Proverbs: Chapters 1–15. Wm. B. Eerdmans. ISBN 978-0-8028-2545-2.
- Waltke, Bruce (2005). The Book of Proverbs: Chapters 15–31. Wm. B. Eerdmans. ISBN 978-0-8028-2776-0.
- Waltke, Bruce K.; De Silva, Ivan D. V. (2021). Proverbs: A Shorter Commentary. Wm. B. Eerdmans. ISBN 978-0-8028-7503-7.

Book of Proverbs Wisdom literature
| Preceded by Psalms | Hebrew Bible | Succeeded by Job |
| Preceded by Psalms | Western; Old Testament | Succeeded by Ecclesiastes |
| Preceded by Odes | E. Orthodox; Old Testament | Succeeded by Ecclesiastes |
