= Job 40 =

40th chapter of the Book of Job

- ← chapter 39 chapter 41 →
- The whole Book of Job in the Leningrad Codex (1008 C.E.) from an old facsimile edition.
- Book: Book of Job
- Hebrew Bible part: Ketuvim
- Order in the Hebrew part: 3
- Category: Sifrei Emet
- Christian Bible part: Old Testament
- Order in the Christian part: 18

Job 40 is the 40th chapter of the Book of Job in the Hebrew Bible or the Old Testament of the Christian Bible. The book is anonymous; most scholars believe it was written around 6th century BCE. This chapter records the speech of God to Job, which belongs to the "Verdicts" section of the book, comprising Job 32:1–42:6.

== Context ==
Job 40 appears towards the end of the book of Job. Traditionally placed in the Ketuvim section of the Hebrew Bible between Psalms and Proverbs, in modern Jewish Bibles, the book is placed after the other two other poetic books. Job is also one of the poetic books in the Christian Old Testament, usually following the book of Esther. The book is structured with a prologue and narrative introduction in the first two chapters, and then the majority of the book is a debate between Job and several of his supposed friends as poetry, which runs until chapter 37.

The chapter is part of the response of God to Job which runs from chapters 38 to 41. The chapter is traditionally divided into three sections. The first two verses are joined with the preceding two chapters from verse 38:1 in God's first speech, Verses 3 to 5 of the chapter are considered a short intermission in God's monologue and cover Job's response to this first speech. The remainder of the chapter, from verse 6 to the end of chapter 41, is considered God's second speech.

== Text ==
The original text is written in Hebrew language. This chapter is divided into 24 verses in English Bibles, but counted to 32 verses in Hebrew Bible using a different verse numbering (see below).

=== Verse numbering ===
There are some differences in verse numbering of this chapter in English Bibles and Hebrew texts:

English	Hebrew
41:1–8	40:25–32
41:9–34	41:1–26

This article generally follows the common numbering in Christian English Bible versions, with notes to the numbering in Hebrew Bible versions.

=== Textual witnesses ===
Some early manuscripts containing the text of this chapter in Hebrew are of the Masoretic Text, which includes the Aleppo Codex (10th century), and Codex Leningradensis (1008).

There is also a translation into Koine Greek known as the Septuagint, made in the last few centuries BCE; some extant ancient manuscripts of this version include Codex Vaticanus (B; $\mathfrak{G}$^{B}; 4th century), Codex Sinaiticus (S; BHK: $\mathfrak{G}$^{S}; 4th century), and Codex Alexandrinus (A; $\mathfrak{G}$^{A}; 5th century).

== Analysis ==
The structure of the book is as follows:

- The Prologue (chapters 1–2)
- The Dialogue (chapters 3–31)
- The Verdicts (32:1–42:6)
- The Epilogue (42:7–17)

Within the structure, chapter 40 is grouped into the Verdict section with the following outline:

- Elihu's Verdict (32:1–37:24)
- God's Appearance (Yahweh Speeches) and Job's Responses (38:1–42:6)
  - God's First Speech (38:1–40:2)
    - Theme Verse and Summons (38:1–3)
    - The Physical World (38:4–38)
    - The Physical Earth (38:4–7)
    - The Sea (38:8–11)
    - The Morning (38:12–15)
    - The Outer Limits of the Earth (38:16–18)
    - Light and Darkness (38:19–21)
    - The Waters – Snow, Hail, Rain, Frost, Ice (38:22–30)
    - The Heavenly Bodies (38:31–33)
    - Storms (38:34–38)
  - The Animal World (38:39–40:2)
    - God Provides for the Lions and Ravens (38:39–41)
    - The Mountain Goats (39:1–4)
    - The Wild Donkey (39:5–8)
    - The Wild Ox (39:9–12)
    - The Ostrich (39:13–18)
    - The Warhorse (39:19–25)
      - The Hawk and the Eagle (39:26–30)
    - Brief Challenge to Answer (40:1–2)
  - Job's First Reply – An Insufficient Response (40:3–5)
  - God's Second Speech (40:6–41:34)
    - Theme Verse and Summons (40:6–8)
    - The Challenge Expanded (40:9–14)
    - The Challenge of Controlling Behemoth (40:15–24)
    - Leviathan (41:1–34)
      - The Challenge to Contend with Leviathan (41:1–7)
      - Some Conclusions (41:8–11)
      - His Armor (41:12–17)
      - His Breathing. of Fire (41:18–21)
      - His Strength (41:22–25)
      - Weapons Cannot Defeat Him (41:26–29)
      - He Creates Turmoil (41:30–32)
      - Conclusion (41:33–34)
  - Job's Second Reply (42:1–6)

God's speeches in chapters 38–41 can be split into two parts, both starting with almost identical phrases and having a similar structure:

First speech	Second speech
A. Introductory formula (38:1)	A1. Introductory formula (40:6)
B. Thematic challenge (38:2–3) i. Theme A (key verse – verse 2) ii. Summons (verse 3)	B1. Thematic challenge (40:7–14) i. Summons (verse 7) ii. Theme B (key verse – verse 8) iii. Challenge expanded (verses 9–14)
C, Particularization of theme i. In the physical world (38:4–38) ii. In the animal and bird kingdoms (38:39–39:30)	C1, Particularization of theme i. With Behemoth (40:15–24) ii. With Leviathan (41:1–34)
D. Brief Challenge to Answer (40:1–2)

The revelation of God to Job represents the culmination of the book of Job. In this moment, the LORD speaks directly to Job, showcasing his sovereign power and glory. Throughout his suffering, Job remains steadfast, never cursing God or losing his integrity, and does not express regret. However, he is unaware of the true reasons behind his suffering. Therefore, God intervenes to address the spiritual issues that have arisen. Job was not punished for his sins, and his suffering did not separate him from God. Now, Job recognizes that he cannot fully understand the reasons behind his suffering, and it is wiser to submit to and adore God rather than try to judge him.

Chapter 40 opens with a short dialogue between YHWH and Job (verses 1–5) interposed between the first and second speeches of YHWH. It is followed by God's second speech, which focuses mainly on two figures: Behemoth (Job 40) and Leviathan (Job 41).

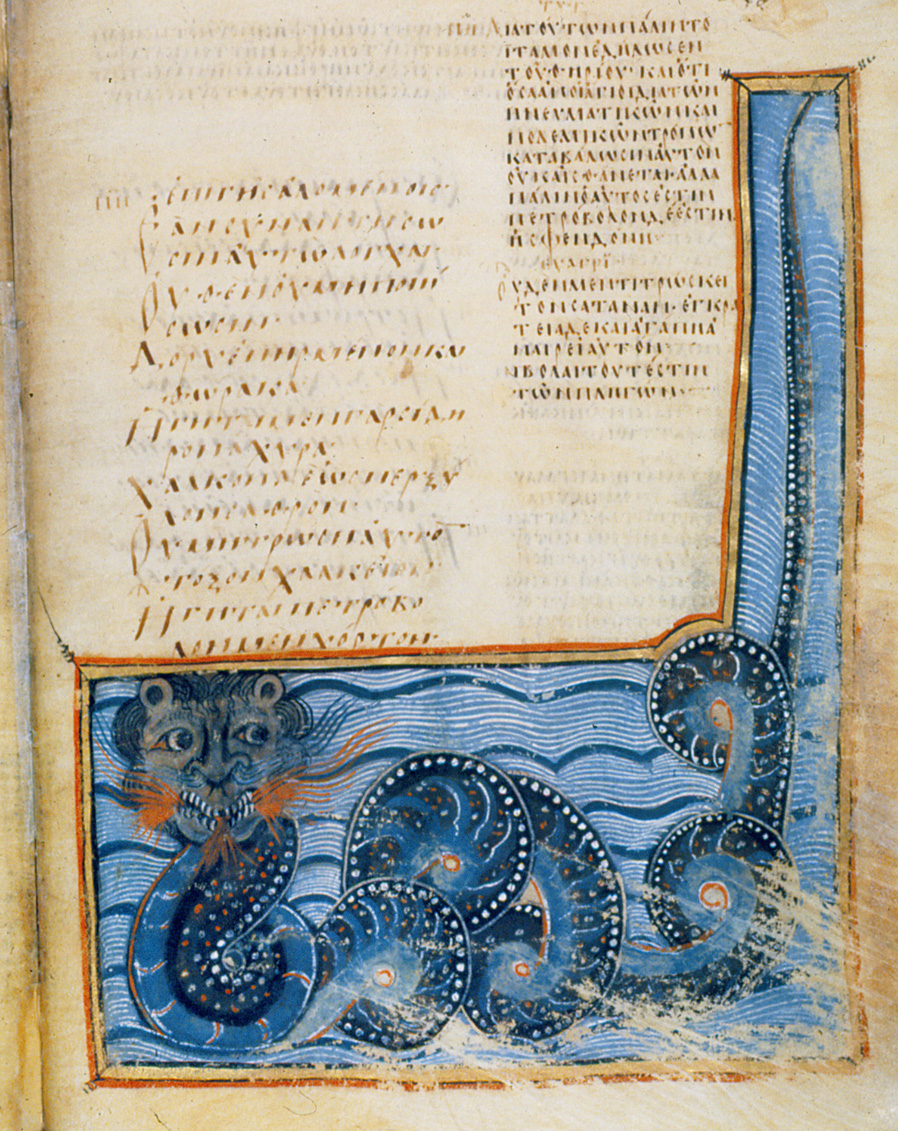
"God speaks to Job", from: Book of Job in Illuminated Byzantine Manuscripts with Cyclic Illustration (AD 900). Biblioteca Apostolica Vaticana. Rome

== Dialogue between God and Job (40:1–5) ==
The inclusion of legal terms such as "contend," "argue," and "answer" within the litigation motif indicates that YHWH aims to demonstrate to Job the flaws in his perspective. This suggests that Job's desire to confront God in court is rooted in a limited understanding of retributive justice as it exists in the world. YHWH is not just a judge but also the king who actively exercises his sovereign rule with a complex governing of the universe. YHWH's summation (verse 2) shows Job the futility of his pursuit and the implied way forward for Job to acknowledge it.

=== Verse 2 ===
[YHWH said:] "Shall the one who contends with the Almighty correct Him?

He who rebukes God, let him answer it."

- "Contends": translated from the Hebrew word רֹב, rov, the infinitive absolute from the verb רִיב, riv ("contend", "quarrel"); the repoint of the word to be an active participle would render it as "the one who argues with the Almighty".
- "Correct": translated from the Hebrew verb יִסּוֹר yissor—found only here, but comes from a common root meaning "to correct; to reprove"; it has been suggested to be read as יָסוּר yasur with the meaning of "to turn aside" or "to yield", but the Masoretic Text could be read as "to correct; to instruct".

=== Verse 4 ===
[Job said:] "Behold, I am vile;

What shall I answer You?

I lay my hand over my mouth."

- "Vile" translated from the Hebrew word קַלֹּתִי, qalloti ("to be light; to be of small account; to be unimportant"), from which comes the meaning "contemptible"; in the causative stem would mean "to treat with contempt; to curse".

Job's acknowledgement that he is "small" ("vile"; rather than he has sinned) shows the turning point from arguing against YHWH into accepting what YHWH has done in Job's life. This answer of Job is still tentative, so YHWH proceeds with a second round of questions and observations (Job 40:6–41:34) to finally prompt Job to give his ultimate response (Job 42:1–6).

== God speaks of Behemoth (40:6–24) ==
God's second speech begins with a challenge to announce the theme (40:6–14) before proceeding with the description of Behemoth (40:15–24) and Leviathan (41:1–34). These two creatures are described as big in size and uncontrollable by humans, but YHWH totally control them all in his orderly world.

=== Verse 6 ===
Then the LORD answered Job out of the whirlwind, and said:

- Cross reference: Job 38:1
- "Whirlwind" or "storm", a common accompaniment for a theophany (cf. Ezekiel 1:4; Nahum 1:3; Zechariah 9:14). It was a sign of the arrival of YHWH before speaking to the people of Israel (Exodus 19:16–20:21). In the early part of the book of Job, a storm caused Job's pain (Job 1:19; 9:17), and now becomes the setting of YHWH's direct communication to Job.

=== Verse 15 ===
[YHWH said:] "Look now at the behemoth

which I made along with you;
he eats grass like an ox."

- "Behemoth": in Hebrew literally means "beast" (in the feminine plural form), here refers to a large animal with unknown exact identity. It has been identified with the hippopotamus, which lives in Egypt, not in Palestine, although it can also be used as a normal word for a great beast including a large cow. Behemoth is frequently used to describe a large and cumbersome object. The term, when used to describe a person, alludes to dehumanization.
- "Along with you": in Hebrew literally "with you"; maybe a temporal meaning ("when I made you")—perhaps a reference to the sixth day of creation (Genesis 1:24). Although humans cannot control Behemoth, YHWH securely controls it, so it does not become a threat to the divine order of the world (Job 40:19).

== See also ==
- Divine judgment
- Pride
- Jordan River
- Humility
- Whirlwind
- Related Bible parts: Job 38, Job 39, Job 41,

== Sources ==
- Alter, Robert (2010). The Wisdom Books: Job, Proverbs, and Ecclesiastes: A Translation with Commentary. W.W. Norton & Co. ISBN 978-0-3-9308-073-5.
- Coogan, Michael David (2007). Coogan, Michael David; Brettler, Marc Zvi; Newsom, Carol Ann; Perkins, Pheme (eds.). The New Oxford Annotated Bible with the Apocryphal/Deuterocanonical Books: New Revised Standard Version, Issue 48 (Augmented 3rd ed.). Oxford University Press. ISBN 978-0-19528-881-0.
- Coogan, Michael David (2011). The Oxford Encyclopedia of the Books of the Bible Volume 1. Oxford: Oxford University Press. ISBN 978-0-19537-737-8.
- Crenshaw, James L. (2007). "17. Job". In Barton, John; Muddiman, John (eds.). The Oxford Bible Commentary (first (paperback) ed.). Oxford University Press. pp. 331–355. ISBN 978-0-19927-718-6.
- Deane-Drummond, Celia; Clough, David (2009). Creaturely Theology: On God, Humans and Other Animals. London: SCM Press. ISBN 978-0-33404-189-4.
- Estes, Daniel J. (2013). Walton, John H.; Strauss, Mark L. (eds.). Job. Teach the Text Commentary Series. United States: Baker Publishing Group. ISBN 9781441242778.
- Farmer, Kathleen A. (1998). "The Wisdom Books". In McKenzie, Steven L.; Graham, Matt Patrick (eds.). The Hebrew Bible Today: An Introduction to Critical Issues. Westminster John Knox Press. ISBN 978-0-66425-652-4.
- Halley, Henry H. (1965). Halley's Bible Handbook: an abbreviated Bible commentary (24th (revised) ed.). Zondervan Publishing House. ISBN 0-310-25720-4.
- Hesselgrave, Ronald P. (2016). I Know that My Redeemer Lives. Eugene: Wipf & Stock. ISBN 978-1-49828-158-4.
- Kugler, Robert; Hartin, Patrick J. (2009). An Introduction to the Bible. Eerdmans. ISBN 978-0-80284-636-5.
- O'Connor, Kathleen (2012). Job. Collegeville: Liturgical Press. ISBN 978-0-81464-789-9.
- Ortlund, Eric (2021). Piercing Leviathan: God's Defeat of Evil In The Book of Job. London: Apollos/Intervarsity Press. ISBN 978-1-78974-299-2.
- Walton, John H. (2012). Job. United States: Zondervan. ISBN 978-0-31049-200-9.
- Wilson, Lindsay (2015). Job. United States: Wm. B. Eerdmans Publishing Company. ISBN 978-1-46744-328-9.
- Würthwein, Ernst (1995). The Text of the Old Testament. Translated by Rhodes, Erroll F. Grand Rapids, MI: Wm. B. Eerdmans. ISBN 0-8028-0788-7.
