= Proverbs 31 =

Final chapter of the Book of Proverbs in the Bible

- ← chapter 30 Ecclesiastes 1 →
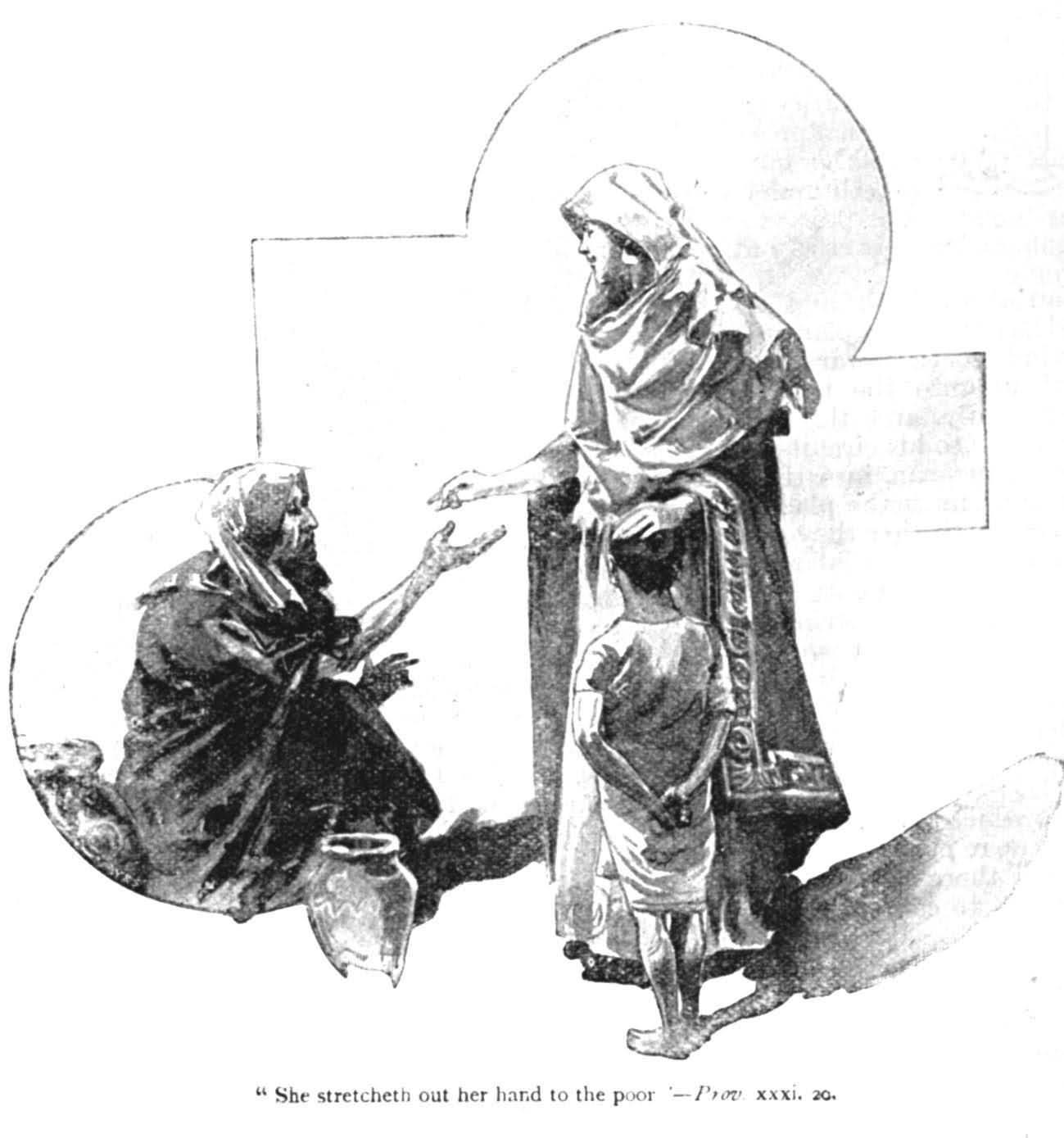
- Depiction of Proverbs 31:20, "She stretcheth out her hand to the poor..."
- Book: Book of Proverbs
- Category: Ketuvim
- Christian Bible part: Old Testament
- Order in the Christian part: 21

Proverbs 31 is the 31st and final chapter of the Book of Proverbs in the Hebrew Bible or the Old Testament of the Christian Bible. Verses 1 to 9 present the advice which King Lemuel's mother gave to him, about how a just king should reign. The remaining verses (verses 10–31) detail the attributes of a good wife or an ideal woman. The latter section is also known as Eshet Ḥayil.

== Text ==
=== Hebrew ===
Some early manuscripts containing the text of this chapter in Hebrew are of the Masoretic Text: these include the Aleppo Codex (10th century), and Codex Leningradensis (1008).

The following table shows the Hebrew text of Proverbs 31 with not only vowels but also [Hebrew cantillation] Trope Symbols included, alongside an English translation based upon the JPS 1917 translation (now in the public domain).

Verse	Hebrew	English translation (JPS 1917)
1	דִּ֭בְרֵי לְמוּאֵ֣ל מֶ֑לֶךְ מַ֝שָּׂ֗א אֲֽשֶׁר־יִסְּרַ֥תּוּ אִמּֽוֹ׃	The words of king Lemuel; the burden wherewith his mother corrected him.
2	מַה־בְּ֭רִי וּמַֽה־בַּר־בִּטְנִ֑י וּ֝מֶ֗ה בַּר־נְדָרָֽי׃	What, my son? and what, O son of my womb? And what, O son of my vows?
3	אַל־תִּתֵּ֣ן לַנָּשִׁ֣ים חֵילֶ֑ךָ וּ֝דְרָכֶ֗יךָ לַֽמְח֥וֹת מְלָכִֽין׃	Give not thy strength unto women, Nor thy ways to that which destroyeth kings.
4	אַ֤ל לַֽמְלָכִ֨ים ׀ לְֽמוֹאֵ֗ל אַ֣ל לַֽמְלָכִ֣ים שְׁתוֹ־יָ֑יִן וּ֝לְרוֹזְנִ֗ים (או) [אֵ֣י] שֵׁכָֽר׃	It is not for kings, O Lemuel, it is not for kings to drink wine: Nor for princes to say: ‘Where is strong drink?’
5	פֶּן־יִ֭שְׁתֶּה וְיִשְׁכַּ֣ח מְחֻקָּ֑ק וִ֝ישַׁנֶּ֗ה דִּ֣ין כׇּל־בְּנֵי־עֹֽנִי׃	Lest they drink, and forget that which is decreed, And pervert the justice due to any that is afflicted.
6	תְּנוּ־שֵׁכָ֥ר לְאוֹבֵ֑ד וְ֝יַ֗יִן לְמָ֣רֵי נָֽפֶשׁ׃	Give strong drink unto him that is ready to perish, And wine unto the bitter in soul;
7	יִ֭שְׁתֶּה וְיִשְׁכַּ֣ח רִישׁ֑וֹ וַ֝עֲמָל֗וֹ לֹ֣א יִזְכׇּר־עֽוֹד׃	Let him drink, and forget his poverty, and remember his misery no more.
8	פְּתַח־פִּ֥יךָ לְאִלֵּ֑ם אֶל־דִּ֝֗ין כׇּל־בְּנֵ֥י חֲלֽוֹף׃	Open thy mouth for the dumb, in the cause of all such as are appointed to destruction.
9	פְּתַח־פִּ֥יךָ שְׁפׇט־צֶ֑דֶק וְ֝דִ֗ין עָנִ֥י וְאֶבְיֽוֹן׃	Open thy mouth, judge righteously, and plead the cause of the poor and needy.
10	אֵֽשֶׁת־חַ֭יִל מִ֣י יִמְצָ֑א וְרָחֹ֖ק מִפְּנִינִ֣ים מִכְרָֽהּ׃	A woman of valour who can find? For her price is far above rubies.
11	בָּ֣טַח בָּ֭הּ לֵ֣ב בַּעְלָ֑הּ וְ֝שָׁלָ֗ל לֹ֣א יֶחְסָֽר׃	The heart of her husband doth safely trust in her, and he hath no lack of gain.
12	גְּמָלַ֣תְהוּ ט֣וֹב וְלֹא־רָ֑ע כֹּ֝֗ל יְמֵ֣י חַיֶּֽיהָ׃	She doeth him good and not evil all the days of her life.
13	דָּ֭רְשָׁה צֶ֣מֶר וּפִשְׁתִּ֑ים וַ֝תַּ֗עַשׂ בְּחֵ֣פֶץ כַּפֶּֽיהָ׃	She seeketh wool and flax, and worketh willingly with her hands.
14	הָ֭יְתָה כׇּאֳנִיּ֣וֹת סוֹחֵ֑ר מִ֝מֶּרְחָ֗ק תָּבִ֥יא לַחְמָֽהּ׃	She is like the merchant-ships; she bringeth her food from afar.
15	וַתָּ֤קׇם ׀ בְּע֬וֹד לַ֗יְלָה וַתִּתֵּ֣ן טֶ֣רֶף לְבֵיתָ֑הּ וְ֝חֹ֗ק לְנַעֲרֹתֶֽיהָ׃	She riseth also while it is yet night, and giveth food to her household, and a portion to her maidens.
16	זָֽמְמָ֣ה שָׂ֭דֶה וַתִּקָּחֵ֑הוּ מִפְּרִ֥י כַ֝פֶּ֗יהָ (נטע) [נָ֣טְעָה] כָּֽרֶם׃	She considereth a field, and buyeth it; with the fruit of her hands she planteth a vineyard.
17	חָֽגְרָ֣ה בְע֣וֹז מׇתְנֶ֑יהָ וַ֝תְּאַמֵּ֗ץ זְרוֹעֹתֶֽיהָ׃	She girdeth her loins with strength, And maketh strong her arms.
18	טָ֭עֲמָה כִּי־ט֣וֹב סַחְרָ֑הּ לֹא־יִכְבֶּ֖ה (בליל) [בַלַּ֣יְלָה] נֵרָֽהּ׃	She perceiveth that her merchandise is good; Her lamp goeth not out by night.
19	יָ֭דֶיהָ שִׁלְּחָ֣ה בַכִּישׁ֑וֹר וְ֝כַפֶּ֗יהָ תָּ֣מְכוּ פָֽלֶךְ׃	She layeth her hands to the distaff, And her hands hold the spindle.
20	כַּ֭פָּהּ פָּֽרְשָׂ֣ה לֶעָנִ֑י וְ֝יָדֶ֗יהָ שִׁלְּחָ֥ה לָאֶבְיֽוֹן׃	She stretcheth out her hand to the poor; Yea, she reacheth forth her hands to the needy.
21	לֹא־תִירָ֣א לְבֵיתָ֣הּ מִשָּׁ֑לֶג כִּ֥י כׇל־בֵּ֝יתָ֗הּ לָבֻ֥שׁ שָׁנִֽים׃	She is not afraid of the snow for her household; For all her household are clothed with scarlet.
22	מַרְבַדִּ֥ים עָֽשְׂתָה־לָּ֑הּ שֵׁ֖שׁ וְאַרְגָּמָ֣ן לְבוּשָֽׁהּ׃	She maketh for herself coverlets; Her clothing is fine linen and purple.
23	נוֹדָ֣ע בַּשְּׁעָרִ֣ים בַּעְלָ֑הּ בְּ֝שִׁבְתּ֗וֹ עִם־זִקְנֵי־אָֽרֶץ׃	Her husband is known in the gates, When he sitteth among the elders of the land.
24	סָדִ֣ין עָ֭שְׂתָה וַתִּמְכֹּ֑ר וַ֝חֲג֗וֹר נָתְנָ֥ה לַֽכְּנַעֲנִֽי׃	She maketh linen garments and selleth them; And delivereth girdles unto the merchant.
25	עֹז־וְהָדָ֥ר לְבוּשָׁ֑הּ וַ֝תִּשְׂחַ֗ק לְי֣וֹם אַחֲרֽוֹן׃	Strength and dignity are her clothing; And she laugheth at the time to come.
26	פִּ֭יהָ פָּתְחָ֣ה בְחׇכְמָ֑ה וְת֥וֹרַת חֶ֝֗סֶד עַל־לְשׁוֹנָֽהּ׃	She openeth her mouth with wisdom; And the law of kindness is on her tongue.
27	צ֭וֹפִיָּה (הילכות) [הֲלִיכ֣וֹת] בֵּיתָ֑הּ וְלֶ֥חֶם עַ֝צְל֗וּת לֹ֣א תֹאכֵֽל׃	She looketh well to the ways of her household, And eateth not the bread of idleness.
28	קָ֣מוּ בָ֭נֶיהָ וַֽיְאַשְּׁר֑וּהָ בַּ֝עְלָ֗הּ וַֽיְהַלְלָֽהּ׃	Her children rise up, and call her blessed; Her husband also, and he praiseth her:
29	רַבּ֣וֹת בָּ֭נוֹת עָ֣שׂוּ חָ֑יִל וְ֝אַ֗תְּ עָלִ֥ית עַל־כֻּלָּֽנָה׃	’Many daughters have done valiantly, But thou excellest them all.’
30	שֶׁ֣קֶר הַ֭חֵן וְהֶ֣בֶל הַיֹּ֑פִי אִשָּׁ֥ה יִרְאַת־יְ֝הֹוָ֗ה הִ֣יא תִתְהַלָּֽל׃	Grace is deceitful, and beauty is vain; But a woman that feareth the LORD, she shall be praised.
31	תְּנוּ־לָ֭הּ מִפְּרִ֣י יָדֶ֑יהָ וִיהַלְל֖וּהָ בַשְּׁעָרִ֣ים מַֽעֲשֶֽׂיהָ׃	Give her of the fruit of her hands; And let her works praise her in the gates.

=== Greek ===
There is also a translation into Koine Greek known as the Septuagint, made in the last few centuries BC. Extant ancient manuscripts of the Septuagint version include Codex Vaticanus (B; $\mathfrak{G}$^{B}; 4th century), Codex Sinaiticus (S; BHK: $\mathfrak{G}$^{S}; 4th century), and Codex Alexandrinus (A; $\mathfrak{G}$^{A}; 5th century).

== The words of Lemuel (verses 1–9) ==
In this part, an unnamed queen-mother (see "queen mother") gives instruction to her son, King Lemuel, on his duty to administer justice. Using the appeal to his filial respect to a mother and his birth as an answer of a prayer (verse 2, cf. 1 Samuel 1:11), the mother warns the king against sexual promiscuity and drunkenness (verses 3–7). The eighth and ninth verses are an appeal against inequality and injustice.

== The good wife (verses 10–31) ==
Verses 10–31 of this chapter, also called Eshet Ḥayil (Hebrew: אשת חיל, lit. 'woman of valor'), form an acrostic poem in praise of the good wife, a definition of a perfect wife or "ideal woman" in the nation of Israel, who is 'an industrious housewife, a shrewd businesswoman, an enterprising trader, a generous benefactor (verse 20) and a wise teacher (verse 26). This "Woman of Valor" has been described as the personification of wisdom, or in some sense as a description of a particular class of women in Israel, Persia, or in Hellenistic society. Some see this as a praise directed from the husband to his wife.

It is one of the thirteen alphabetical acrostic poems in the Bible, where each line begins with a successive letter in the Hebrew alphabet. The word חיל (Ḥayil) appears in verses 10 and 29 of the passage, thought as the summary of the good woman's character. Traditionally it has been translated as "virtuous" or "noble". Some scholars have suggested that it rather means "forceful", "mighty", or "valiant", because this word is almost exclusively used in the Tanakh with reference to warfare.

Aberdeen theologian Kenneth Aitken notes that in view of the warnings against women portrayed as dangerous or adulterous in chapters 1 to 9, it is "fitting" that the book ends by "directing the attention of prospective bridegrooms to the ideal wife".

=== Verse 30 ===
Charm is deceitful and beauty is passing,

But a woman who fears the Lord, she shall be praised.

The key to the woman's industry, acumen, kindness and wisdom lies in her "fear of the LORD".

== Uses ==
In Jewish tradition, Eshet Ḥayil is customarily sung at the Shabbat dinner, after the liturgical poem Shalom Aleichem and before the Kiddush.

The chapter has been emphasized within the biblical womanhood movement, and a number of books have been published on the "Proverbs 31 woman". This emphasis has been subject to criticism in Christian articles.

== Sources ==
- Aitken, K. T. (2007). "19. Proverbs". In Barton, John; Muddiman, John (eds.). The Oxford Bible Commentary (first (paperback) ed.). Oxford University Press. pp. 405–422. ISBN 978-0199277186.
- Halley, Henry H. (1965). Halley's Bible Handbook: an abbreviated Bible commentary (24th (revised) ed.). Zondervan Publishing House. ISBN 0-310-25720-4.
- Würthwein, Ernst (1995). The Text of the Old Testament. Translated by Rhodes, Erroll F. Grand Rapids, MI: Wm. B. Eerdmans. ISBN 0-8028-0788-7.
