= Leo G. Perdue =

Leo G. Perdue (1946–2017) was "one of the leading international scholars in the field of biblical wisdom" and "Dean and Professor of Hebrew Bible at Brite Divinity School", Fort Worth, Texas and editor for The Library of Biblical Theology at Abingdon Press and Vandenhoeck & Ruprecht's Library of Wisdom.

Leo Garrett Perdue was a First American (Chickasaw Nation) born in Pauls Valley, Oklahoma. Perdue authored several books, monographs, and commentaries.

== Published works ==
=== Books ===
- Proverbs: Interpretation: A Bible Commentary for Teaching and Preaching (Interpretation: A Bible Commentary for Teaching & Preaching)
- The Sword and the Stylus: An Introduction to Wisdom in the Age of Empires
- Reconstructing Old Testament Theology: After the Collapse of History (Overtures to Biblical Theology)
- Wisdom Literature: A Theological History

==== Edited copies ====
- Biblical Theology: Introducing the Conversation (Library of Biblical Theology) (Perdue/Morgan/Sommer)

==== Articles and essays ====
- Perdue, Leo G. "Ben Sira and the Prophets." In Intertextual Studies in Ben Sira and Tobit: Essays in Honor of Alexander A. Di Lella, O.F.M., edited by Jeremy Corley and Vincent T. M. Skemp, 132–154. Washington, DC: Catholic Biblical Association of America, 2005.
