= Lemuel (biblical king) =

Biblical king mentioned in Proverbs

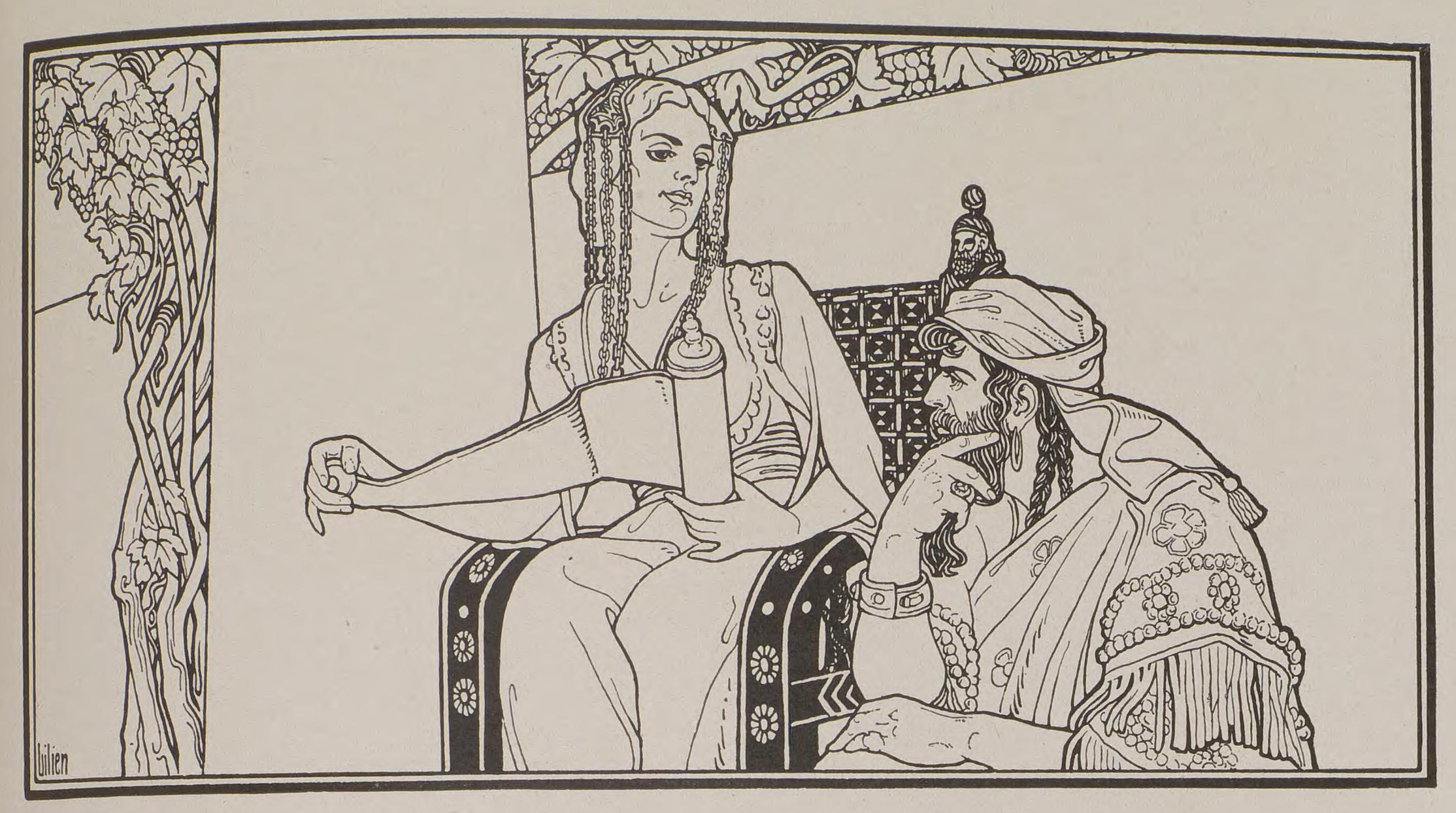
Lemuel and his mother

Lemuel (Hebrew: לְמוּאֵל Ləmū’ēl, "to him, El") is the name of a biblical king mentioned in Proverbs 31:1 and 4, but whose identity remains uncertain. Speculation exists and proposes that Lemuel should be identified with Solomon or Hezekiah, while others think he may be a king of Massa.

== Name ==
The name is related to Lael found in Numbers 3:24 meaning a man consecrated "to God". In etymological form the name Lemuel is kindred with Jamuel (Genesis 46:10) and Namuel (1 Chronicles 4:24).

== Biblical passage ==
The opening verse of Proverbs 31 reads: "The words of king Lemuel, the prophecy that his mother taught him." (KJV) and "The words of king Lamuel. The vision wherewith his mother instructed him." (Douay-Rheims). The words written by King Lemuel were actually spoken to him by his mother. "She most likely began instructing him on the themes in Proverbs 31 from his youth. When he was young, her words were probably gentle, but as he grew older, she may have had to firmly lecture him." The Hebrew word "yāsar" has the idea of both instruction and correction.

The name occurs again in verse 4: "It is not for kings, Lemuel, not for kings to drink wine". The discourse, which is an exhortation to chastity, justice, mercy and temperance, appears to end with verse 9, but might continue through the end of the book. Nothing else is found in scriptures concerning Lemuel aside from these two mentions in beginning of Proverbs 31. Jewish legend identifies him as Solomon, taking this advice from his mother Bathsheba; but there is no clear evidence for this.

The widely used Strong's Concordance, a reference work that assigns a unique reference number to every Biblical Hebrew word and its English translation, states that Lemuel is Hebrew word 3927, related to words 3926 and 410 and means "(belonging) to God; Lemuel or Lemoel, a symbolic name of Solomon: -Lemuel". Other Bible commentators concur with Strong's: Easton's Bible Dictionary, Hitchcock's Bible Names, Smith's Bible Dictionary and Nave's Topical Bible. Rashi identifies the portmanteau as meaning "to him, God" more literally, as in "[the king] to whom God [spoke]."

The passage seems to be the one direct address to a king in the Book of Proverbs – something that was the norm in wisdom literature of the ancient world.

Solomon had numerous wives and concubines. Solomon's mother was Bathsheba, which may mean she is the author of the "inspired utterance" of this section of Proverbs. Many commentators typically divide Chapter 31 of Proverbs into two distinct, unrelated sections. Verses 1–9 are directly directed to King Lemuel while Proverbs 31:10–28 describe the virtuous (noble) woman.

Some modern scholars understand "מַ֝שָּׂ֗א" (masa or massa), as a proper noun and not a word meaning "vision", and render the first passage thus: "The words of Lemuel, King of Masa (Assyria)".

== New Testament ==
The Jerusalem Bible notes a parallel between verse 6, Give strong drink to him who is perishing, and wine to those who are bitter of heart, with the wine mixed with gall offered to Jesus on the cross in Matthew 27:34.
