= Job 38 =

38th chapter of the Book of Job

- ← chapter 37 chapter 39 →
- The whole Book of Job in the Leningrad Codex (1008 C.E.) from an old facsimile edition.
- Book: Book of Job
- Hebrew Bible part: Ketuvim
- Order in the Hebrew part: 3
- Category: Sifrei Emet
- Christian Bible part: Old Testament
- Order in the Christian part: 18

Job 38 is the 38th chapter of the Book of Job in the Hebrew Bible or the Old Testament of the Christian Bible. The book is anonymous; most scholars believe it was written around 6th century BCE. This chapter records God's "response" to the allegations put forward by Job in earlier chapters.

== Text ==
The original text is written in Hebrew language. This chapter is divided into 41 verses.

=== Textual witnesses ===
Some early manuscripts containing the text of this chapter in Hebrew are of the Masoretic Text, which includes the Aleppo Codex (10th century), and Codex Leningradensis (1008).

There is also a translation into Koine Greek known as the Septuagint, made in the last few centuries BCE; some extant ancient manuscripts of this version include Codex Vaticanus (B; $\mathfrak{G}$^{B}; 4th century), Codex Sinaiticus (S; BHK: $\mathfrak{G}$^{S}; 4th century), and Codex Alexandrinus (A; $\mathfrak{G}$^{A}; 5th century).

== Analysis ==
The structure of the book is as follows:

- The Prologue (chapters 1–2)
- The Dialogue (chapters 3–31)
- The Verdicts (32:1–42:6)
- The Epilogue (42:7–17)

Within this structure, chapter 38 forms part of the "Verdicts" section with the following outline:

- Elihu's Verdict (32:1–37:24)
- God's Appearance (Yahweh Speeches) and Job's Responses (38:1–42:6)
  - God's First Speech (38:1–40:2)
    - Theme Verse and Summons (38:1–3)
    - The Physical World (38:4–38)
    - The Physical Earth (38:4–7)
    - The Sea (38:8–11)
    - The Morning (38:12–15)
    - The Outer Limits of the Earth (38:16–18)
    - Light and Darkness (38:19–21)
    - The Waters – Snow, Hail, Rain, Frost, Ice (38:22–30)
    - The Heavenly Bodies (38:31–33)
    - Storms (38:34–38)
  - The Animal World (38:39–40:2)
    - God Provides for the Lions and Ravens (38:39–41)
    - The Mountain Goats (39:1–4)
    - The Wild Donkey (39:5–8)
    - The Wild Ox (39:9–12)
    - The Ostrich (39:13–18)
    - The Warhorse (39:19–25)
      - The Hawk and the Eagle (39:26–30)
    - Brief Challenge to Answer (40:1–2)
  - Job's First Reply – An Insufficient Response (40:3–5)
  - God's Second Speech (40:6–41:34)
  - Job's Second Reply (42:1–6)

God's speeches in chapters 38–41 can be split into two parts, both starting with almost identical phrases and having a similar structure:

First speech	Second speech
A. Introductory formula (38:1)	A1. Introductory formula (40:6)
B. Thematic challenge (38:2–3) i. Theme A (key verse – verse 2) ii. Summons (verse 3)	B1. Thematic challenge (40:7–14) i. Summons (verse 7) ii. Theme B (key verse – verse 8) iii. Challenge expanded (verses 9–14)
C, Particularization of theme i. In the physical world (38:4–38) ii. In the animal and bird kingdoms (38:39–39:30)	C1, Particularization of theme i. With Behemoth (40:15–24) ii. With Leviathan (41:1–34)
D. Brief Challenge to Answer (40:1–2)

The revelation of the Lord to Job is the culmination of the book of Job, that the Lord speaks directly to Job and displays his sovereign power and glory. Job has lived through the suffering—without cursing God, holding his integrity, and nowhere regretted it – but he was unaware of the real reason for his suffering, so God intervenes to resolve the spiritual issues that surfaced. Job was not punished for sin and Job's suffering had not cut him off from God, now Job sees the end the point that he cannot have the knowledge to make the assessments he made, so it is wiser to bow in submission and adoration of God than to try to judge him.

The first speech focuses on God's design and control of the world (verse 2; in contrast to Job's limited knowledge), whereas the second speech raises the issue of God's justice (verse 8; in contrast to Job seeking to justify himself).

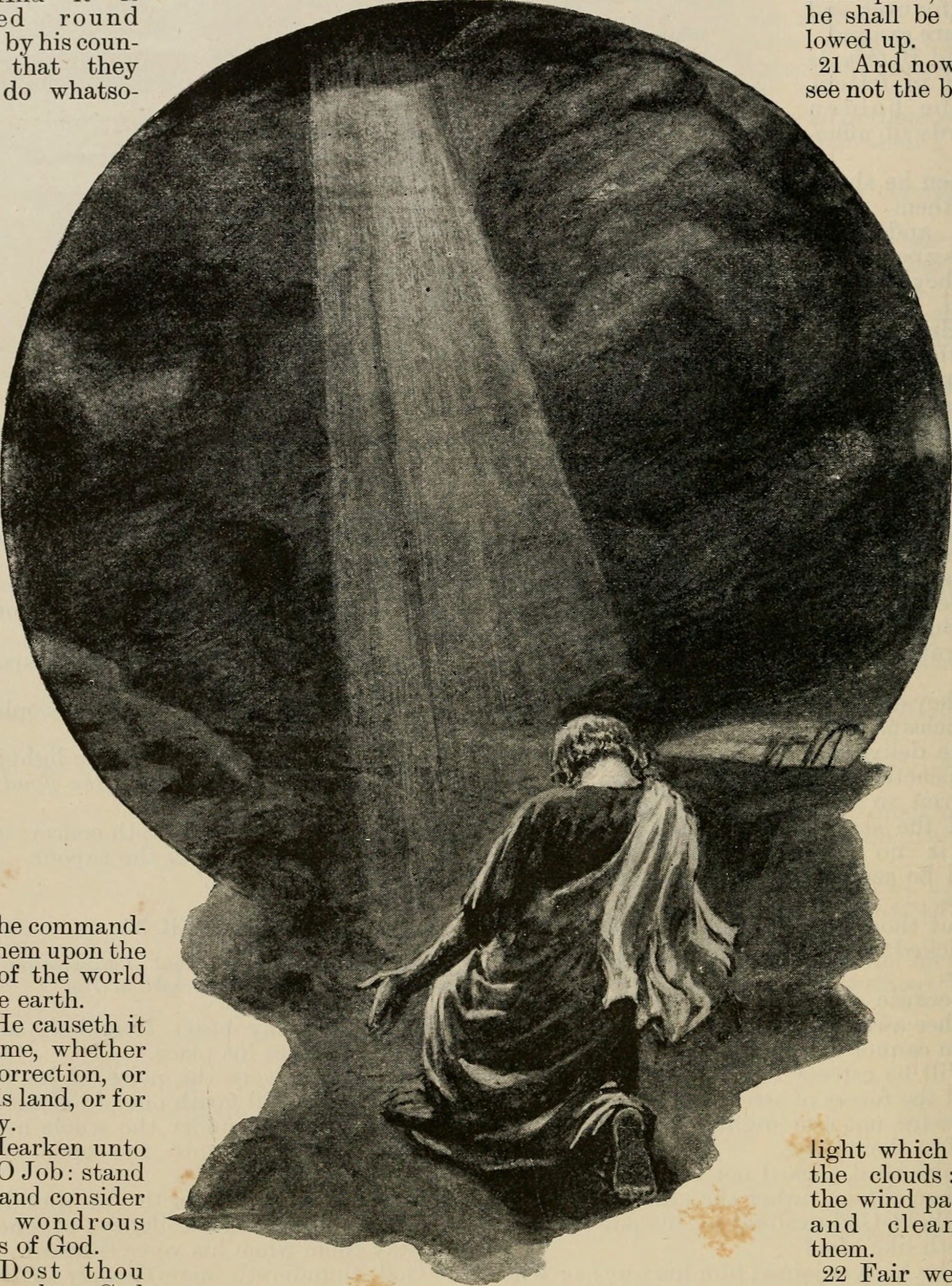
"Out of the whirlwind", from: The art Bible, comprising the Old and new Testaments: with numerous illustrations (1896). London: G. Newnes.

== Theme verse and summons (38:1–3) ==
Verse 1 reintroduces God as YHWH, who speaks out of the whirlwind (a different word from Job 37:9). The speech of God starts by asking the question "Who?" but it is not meant for Job to identify himself, but rather to explain why Job takes the current stance toward God (verse 2), so despite being considered right, Job's understanding is too limited to see God's purposes.

=== Verse 1 ===
Then the Lord answered Job out of the whirlwind and said:

- Cross reference: Job 40:6
- "Whirlwind": or "storm", a common accompaniment for a theophany (see Ezekiel 1:4; Nahum 1:3; Zechariah 9:14). It was a sign of the arrival of YHWH before speaking to the people Israel (Exodus 19:16–20:21). In the early part of the book of Job, a storm caused Job's pain (Job 1:19; 9:17), and now becomes the setting of YHWH's direct communication to Job.

== The mysteries of God's physical worlds (38:4–41) ==
After posing the challenge to Job (38:1–3), God's speech covers the mysteries of earth and sky beyond Job's understanding (4–38) and the mysteries of animal and bird life that surpassed Job's understanding (38:39–39:30). The key point here, as introduced by the "who" questions (verses 5–6), is to show how limited Job's knowledge is to understand the whole situation. The use of lighthearted (almost comical) illustrations softens God's questioning of Job, that it is not intended to be a strong rebuke to Job, but to open Job's "eyes".

=== Verse 8 ===
Or who shut in the sea with doors,
When it burst forth and issued from the womb?

Crenshaw notes that the narrator uses the image of a midwife assisting (in this verse) at the birth of the seas and (in the following verses) in "clothing" them with clouds and darkness.

=== Verse 31 ===
[YHWH said:] "“Can you bind the cluster of the Pleiades,

Or loose the belt of Orion?"

- "Cluster": translated from the Hebrew word מַעֲדַנּ֣וֹת, ma-‘ă-ḏan-nō-wṯ, which is found here and in 1 Samuel 15:32, or possibly in Job 31:36 ("bind"; with a 'metathesis' or a 'reversal of consonants').
- "Pleiades (star cluster)": or "the Seven Stars".

== See also ==
- Book of Job
- Job (biblical figure)
- Hebrew poetry
- Theophany
- Genesis creation narrative
- Orion (constellation)
- Pleiades (star cluster)
- Mazzaroth
- Answer to Job
- Related Bible texts: Job 1, Job 37; (In the Christian Bible only) John 1

== Sources ==
- Alter, Robert (2010). The Wisdom Books: Job, Proverbs, and Ecclesiastes: A Translation with Commentary. W.W. Norton & Co. ISBN 978-0393080735.
- Coogan, Michael David (2007). Coogan, Michael David; Brettler, Marc Zvi; Newsom, Carol Ann; Perkins, Pheme (eds.). The New Oxford Annotated Bible with the Apocryphal/Deuterocanonical Books: New Revised Standard Version, Issue 48 (Augmented 3rd ed.). Oxford University Press. ISBN 9780195288810.
- Crenshaw, James L. (2007). "17. Job". In Barton, John; Muddiman, John (eds.). The Oxford Bible Commentary (first (paperback) ed.). Oxford University Press. pp. 331–355. ISBN 978-0199277186.
- Estes, Daniel J. (2013). Walton, John H.; Strauss, Mark L. (eds.). Job. Teach the Text Commentary Series. United States: Baker Publishing Group. ISBN 9781441242778.
- Farmer, Kathleen A. (1998). "The Wisdom Books". In McKenzie, Steven L.; Graham, Matt Patrick (eds.). The Hebrew Bible Today: An Introduction to Critical Issues. Westminster John Knox Press. ISBN 978-0-66425652-4.
- Halley, Henry H. (1965). Halley's Bible Handbook: an abbreviated Bible commentary (24th (revised) ed.). Zondervan Publishing House. ISBN 0-310-25720-4.
- Kugler, Robert; Hartin, Patrick J. (2009). An Introduction to the Bible. Eerdmans. ISBN 978-0-8028-4636-5.
- Walton, John H. (2012). Job. United States: Zondervan. ISBN 9780310492009.
- Wilson, Lindsay (2015). Job. United States: Wm. B. Eerdmans Publishing Company. ISBN 9781467443289.
- Würthwein, Ernst (1995). The Text of the Old Testament. Translated by Rhodes, Erroll F. Grand Rapids, MI: Wm. B. Eerdmans. ISBN 0-8028-0788-7.
