= Job 39 =

39th chapter of the Book of Job

- ← chapter 38 chapter 40 →
- The whole Book of Job in the Leningrad Codex (1008 C.E.) from an old facsimile edition.
- Book: Book of Job
- Hebrew Bible part: Ketuvim
- Order in the Hebrew part: 3
- Category: Sifrei Emet
- Christian Bible part: Old Testament
- Order in the Christian part: 18

Job 39 is the 39th chapter of the Book of Job in the Hebrew Bible or the Old Testament of the Christian Bible. The book is anonymous; most scholars believe it was written around 6th century BCE. This chapter records the speech of God to Job, which belongs to the "Verdicts" section of the book, comprising Job 32:1–42:6.

== Text ==
The original text is written in Hebrew language. This chapter is divided into 30 verses.

=== Textual witnesses ===
Some early manuscripts containing the text of this chapter in Hebrew are of the Masoretic Text, which includes the Aleppo Codex (10th century), and Codex Leningradensis (1008).

There is also a translation into Koine Greek known as the Septuagint, made in the last few centuries BC; some extant ancient manuscripts of this version include Codex Vaticanus (B; $\mathfrak{G}$^{B}; 4th century), Codex Sinaiticus (S; BHK: $\mathfrak{G}$^{S}; 4th century), and Codex Alexandrinus (A; $\mathfrak{G}$^{A}; 5th century).

== Analysis ==
The structure of the book is as follows:

- The Prologue (chapters 1–2)
- The Dialogue (chapters 3–31)
- The Verdicts (32:1–42:6)
- The Epilogue (42:7–17)

Within the structure, chapter 39 is grouped into the Verdict section with the following outline:

- Elihu's Verdict (32:1–37:24)
- God's Appearance (Yahweh Speeches) and Job's Responses (38:1–42:6)
  - God's First Speech (38:1–40:2)
    - Theme Verse and Summons (38:1–3)
    - The Physical World (38:4–38)
    - The Physical Earth (38:4–7)
    - The Sea (38:8–11)
    - The Morning (38:12–15)
    - The Outer Limits of the Earth (38:16–18)
    - Light and Darkness (38:19–21)
    - The Waters – Snow, Hail, Rain, Frost, Ice (38:22–30)
    - The Heavenly Bodies (38:31–33)
    - Storms (38:34–38)
  - The Animal World (38:39–40:2)
    - God Provides for the Lions and Ravens (38:39–41)
    - The Mountain Goats (39:1–4)
    - The Wild Donkey (39:5–8)
    - The Wild Ox (39:9–12)
    - The Ostrich (39:13–18)
    - The Warhorse (39:19–25)
      - The Hawk and the Eagle (39:26–30)
    - Brief Challenge to Answer (40:1–2)
  - Job's First Reply – An Insufficient Response (40:3–5)
  - God's Second Speech (40:6–41:34)
  - Job's Second Reply (42:1–6)

God's speeches in chapters 38–41 can be split in two parts, both starting with almost identical phrases and having a similar structure:

First speech	Second speech
A. Introductory formula (38:1)	A1. Introductory formula (40:6)
B. Thematic challenge (38:2–3) i. Theme A (key verse – verse 2) ii. Summons (verse 3)	B1. Thematic challenge (40:7–14) i. Summons (verse 7) ii. Theme B (key verse – verse 8) iii. Challenge expanded (verses 9–14)
C, Particularization of theme i. In the physical world (38:4–38) ii. In the animal and bird kingdoms (38:39–39:30)	C1, Particularization of theme i. With Behemoth (40:15–24) ii. With Leviathan (41:1–34)
D. Brief Challenge to Answer (40:1–2)

The revelation of the Lord to Job is the culmination of the book of Job, that the Lord speaks directly to Job and displays his sovereign power and glory. Job has lived through the suffering—without cursing God, holding his integrity, and nowhere regretted it – but he was unaware of the real reason for his suffering, so God intervenes to resolve the spiritual issues that surfaced. Job was not punished for sin and Job's suffering had not cut him off from God, now Job sees the end the point that he cannot have the knowledge to make the assessments he made, so it is wiser to bow in submission and adoration of God than to try to judge him.

A sledge flag used by Robert Falcon Scott in Antarctica during the Terra Nova Expedition (1910–1913), which bears a slightly paraphrased quote from Job 39:26 - "Doth the hawk fly by thy wisdom, and stretch her wings toward the south?"

Chapter 39 completes the survey of animals that began at Job 38:39 (feeding of the lions and the ravens) with the habits and instincts of the "wild goat", the "wild donkey", and "wild ox" (verses 1–12); then a transitionto the most remarkable of birds, the ostrich (verses 13–18), followed by the horse in a passage of extraordinary fire and brilliancy (verses 19–25), closed by the depiction of remarkable birds, the hawk and eagle (verses 26–30).

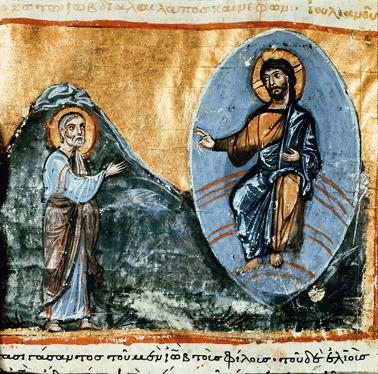
"God speaks to Job", from: Book of Job in Illuminated Byzantine Manuscripts with Cyclic Illustration (AD 1200). Megisti Lavra Monastery, Mount Athos.

=== Verse 1 ===
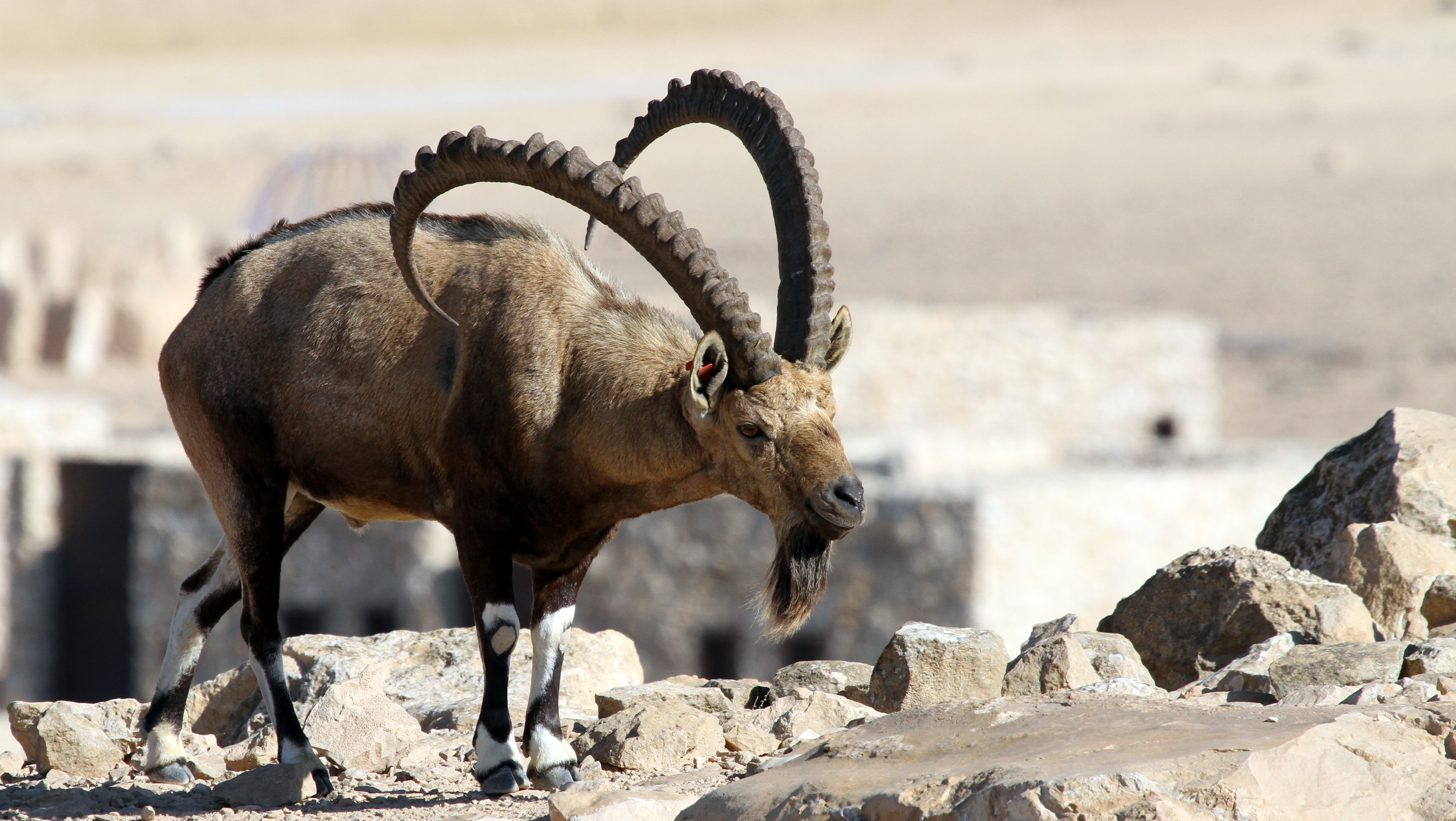
Male

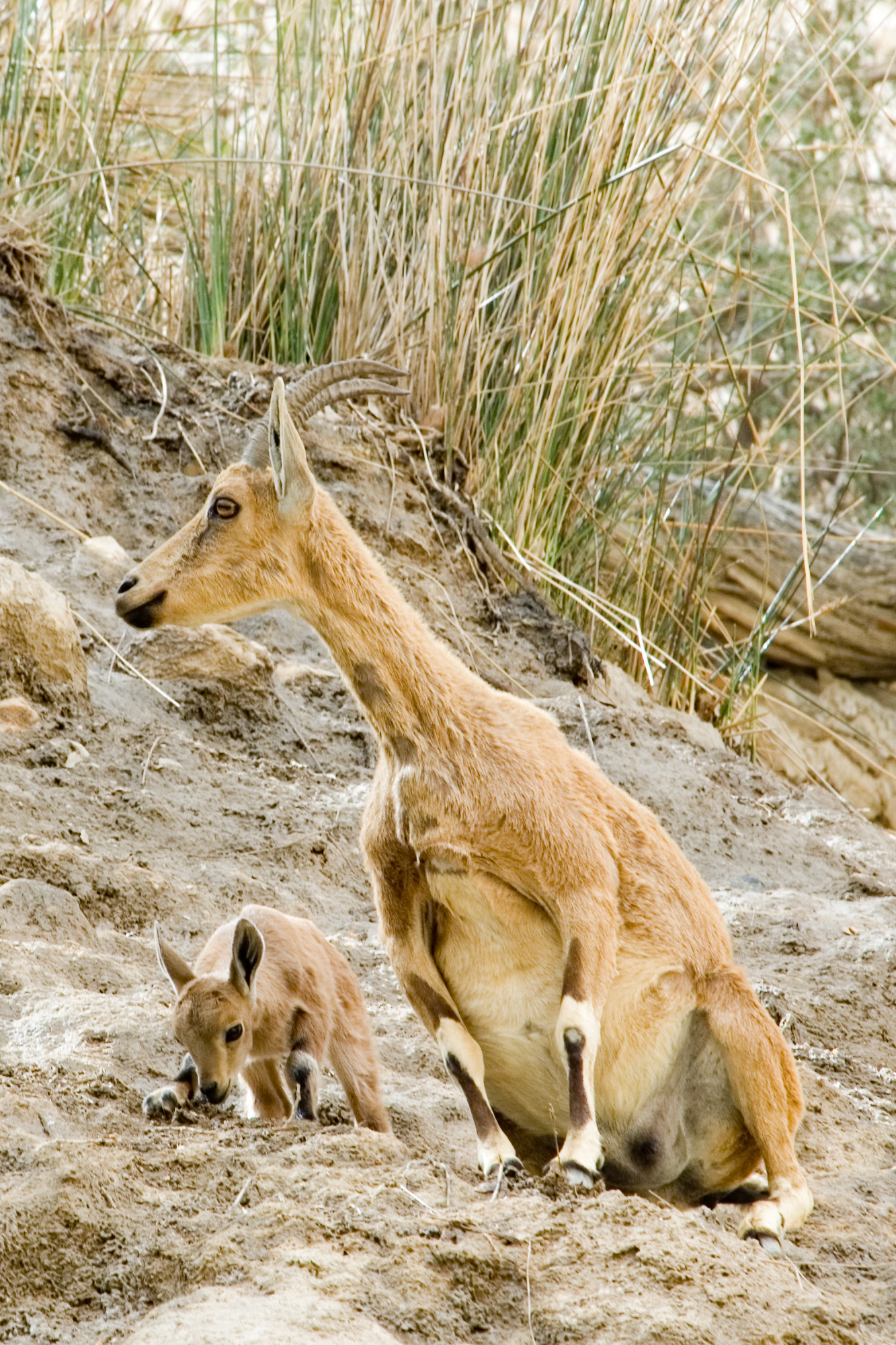
Female with kid

Nubian ibex in Israel

[YHWH said:] "Do you know when the mountain goats give birth?

Do you observe the calving of the does?"

- "Mountain goats": or "wild goats"; identified with Nubian ibex (Capra nubiana or Capra sinaitica
- "Does": or "hinds" (female deer); in parallel to the first statement, here may refer to 'the females of the species of ibex'.

The ibex can only be observed from distance in the En Gedi area of Israel as the animals resist domestication by humans, but manage to survive with the instinct that God has given.

=== Verse 9 ===
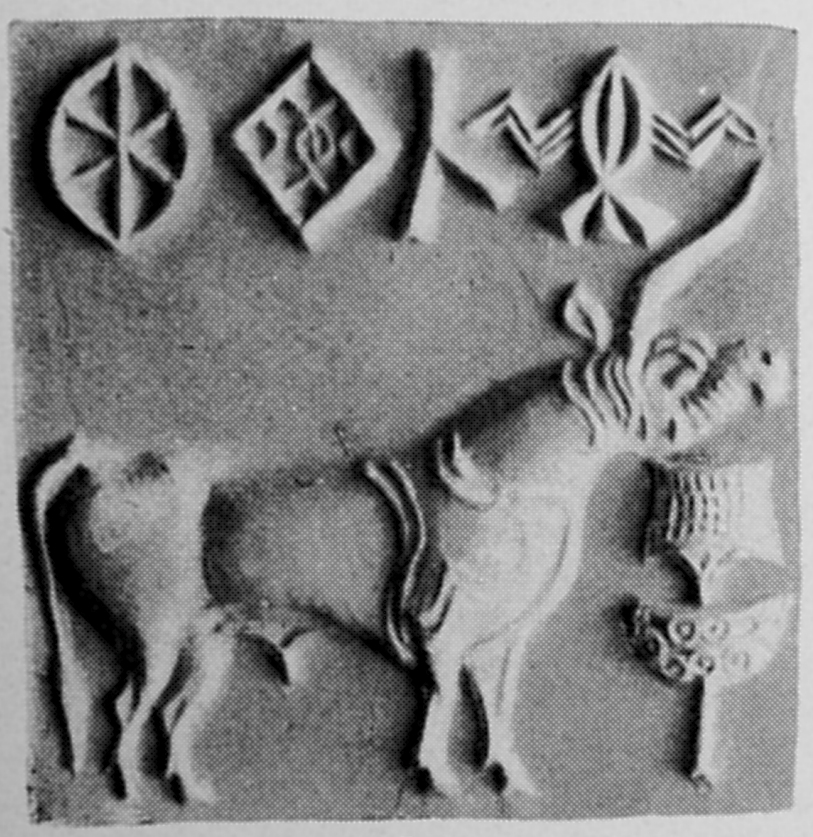
Seal from Mohenjo-daro, Indus Valley

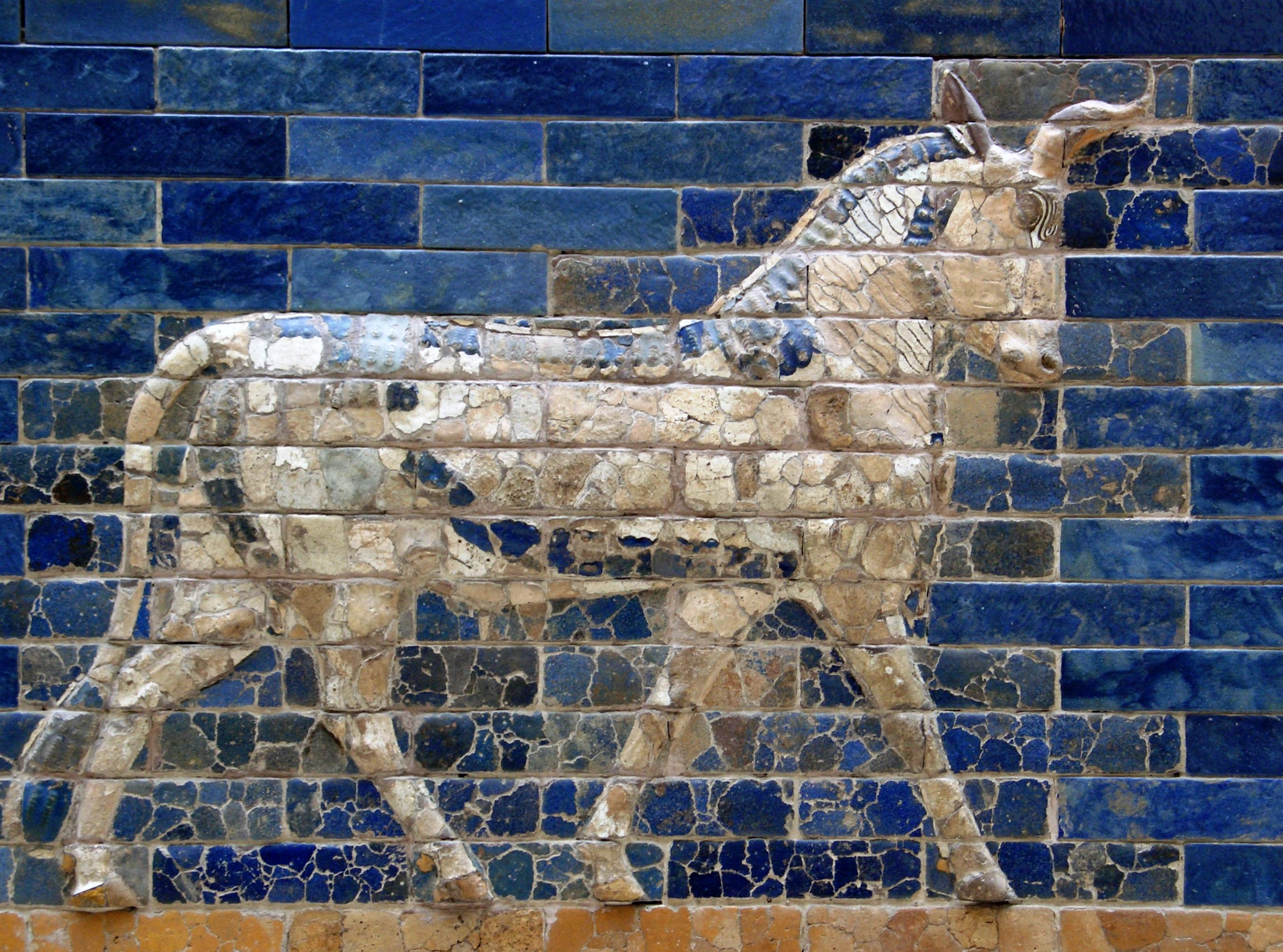
Relief on the Ishtar Gate on display at the Pergamon Museum

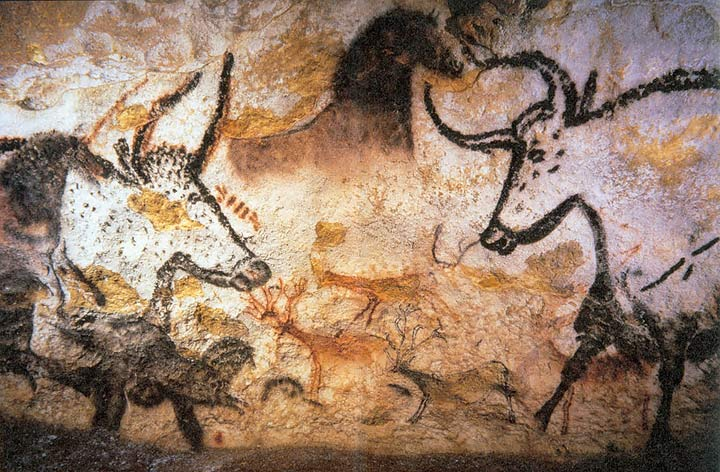
Aurochs in a cave painting in Lascaux

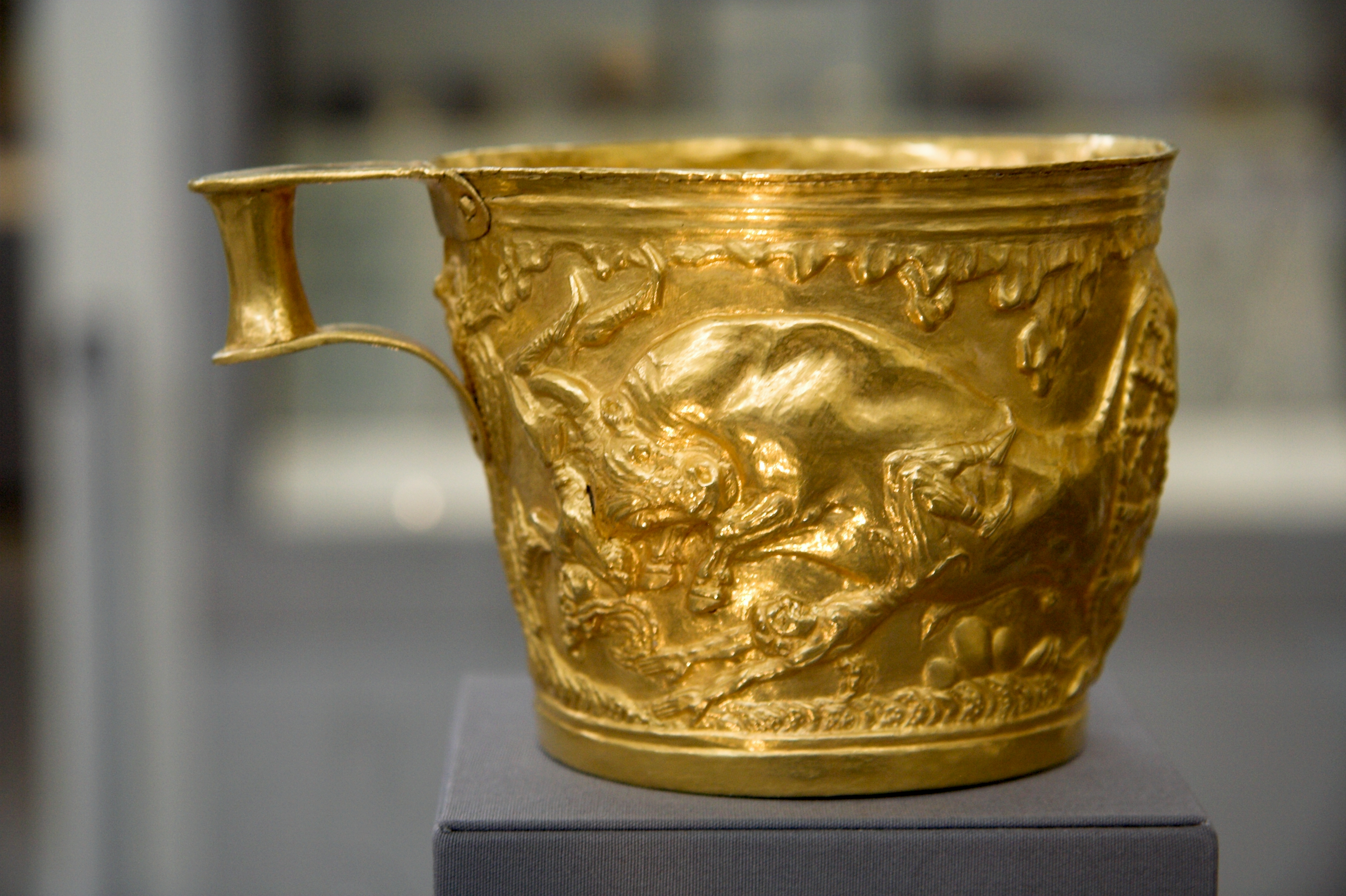
A cup from Vaphio showing an aurochs hunt, 15th century BC

Depiction of aurochs in ancient cultures

[YHWH said:] "Will the wild ox be willing to serve you

or spend the night by your manger?"

- "Wild ox": generally identified with Aurochs (Bos primigenius), now extinct cattle species (considered to be the wild ancestor of modern domestic cattle), one of the largest herbivores in the Holocene. The last known aurochs herd in the world, which lived in a marshy woodland in Poland's Jaktorów Forest, died in 1627 from natural causes.

Art depictions of aurochs exist since as early as the Paleolithic period (such as cave paintings in Lascaux) also in Egyptian, Ugaritic and Mesopotamian paintings, reliefs and literature (including in the hunting scenes).

== See also ==
- Birth
- Donkey
- Goat
- Hawk
- Horse
- Ostrich
- Peafowl
- Unicorn
- Related Bible parts: Job 1, Job 37, Job 38, John 1

== Sources ==
- Alter, Robert (2010). The Wisdom Books: Job, Proverbs, and Ecclesiastes: A Translation with Commentary. W.W. Norton & Co. ISBN 978-0393080735.
- Coogan, Michael David (2007). Coogan, Michael David; Brettler, Marc Zvi; Newsom, Carol Ann; Perkins, Pheme (eds.). The New Oxford Annotated Bible with the Apocryphal/Deuterocanonical Books: New Revised Standard Version, Issue 48 (Augmented 3rd ed.). Oxford University Press. ISBN 9780195288810.
- Crenshaw, James L. (2007). "17. Job". In Barton, John; Muddiman, John (eds.). The Oxford Bible Commentary (first (paperback) ed.). Oxford University Press. pp. 331–355. ISBN 978-0199277186.
- Estes, Daniel J. (2013). Walton, John H.; Strauss, Mark L. (eds.). Job. Teach the Text Commentary Series. United States: Baker Publishing Group. ISBN 9781441242778.
- Farmer, Kathleen A. (1998). "The Wisdom Books". In McKenzie, Steven L.; Graham, Matt Patrick (eds.). The Hebrew Bible Today: An Introduction to Critical Issues. Westminster John Knox Press. ISBN 978-0-66425652-4.
- Halley, Henry H. (1965). Halley's Bible Handbook: an abbreviated Bible commentary (24th (revised) ed.). Zondervan Publishing House. ISBN 0-310-25720-4.
- Kugler, Robert; Hartin, Patrick J. (2009). An Introduction to the Bible. Eerdmans. ISBN 978-0-8028-4636-5.
- Walton, John H. (2012). Job. United States: Zondervan. ISBN 9780310492009.
- Wilson, Lindsay (2015). Job. United States: Wm. B. Eerdmans Publishing Company. ISBN 9781467443289.
- Würthwein, Ernst (1995). The Text of the Old Testament. Translated by Rhodes, Erroll F. Grand Rapids, MI: Wm. B. Eerdmans. ISBN 0-8028-0788-7.
