= Job 24 =

24th chapter of the Book of Job

- ← chapter 23 chapter 25 →
- The whole Book of Job in the Leningrad Codex (1008 C.E.) from an old facsimile edition.
- Book: Book of Job
- Hebrew Bible part: Ketuvim
- Order in the Hebrew part: 3
- Category: Sifrei Emet
- Christian Bible part: Old Testament
- Order in the Christian part: 18

Job 24 is the 24th chapter of the Book of Job in the Hebrew Bible or the Old Testament of the Christian Bible. The book is anonymous; most scholars believe it was written around 6th century BCE. This chapter records the speech of Job, which belongs to the Dialogue section of the book, comprising Job 3:1–31:40.

== Text ==
The original text is written in Hebrew language. This chapter is divided into 25 verses.

=== Textual witnesses ===
Some early manuscripts containing the text of this chapter in Biblical Hebrew are of the Masoretic Text, which includes the Aleppo Codex (10th century), and Codex Leningradensis (1008).

There is also a translation into Koine Greek known as the Septuagint, made in the last few centuries BCE; some extant ancient manuscripts of this version include Codex Vaticanus (B; $\mathfrak{G}$^{B}; 4th century), Codex Sinaiticus (S; BHK: $\mathfrak{G}$^{S}; 4th century), and Codex Alexandrinus (A; $\mathfrak{G}$^{A}; 5th century).

== Analysis ==
The structure of the book is as follows:

- The Prologue (chapters 1–2)
- The Dialogue (chapters 3–31)
- The Verdicts (32:1–42:6)
- The Epilogue (42:7–17)

Within the structure, chapter 24 is grouped into the Dialogue section with the following outline:

- Job's Self-Curse and Self-Lament (3:1–26)
- Round One (4:1–14:22)
- Round Two (15:1–21:34)
- Round Three (22:1–27:23)
  - Eliphaz (22:1–30)
  - Job (23:1–24:25)
    - Pondering Litigation against God (23:1–7)
    - Searching for a Terrifying God (23:8–17)
    - Reflecting on Oppression (24:1–12)
    - Serious Wrongdoing (24:13–17)
    - The Fate of the Wicked (24:18–20)
    - The Prospering of the Wicked (24:21–24)
    - A Final Challenge to the Friends (24:25)
  - Bildad (25:1–6)
  - Job (26:1–27:23)
- Interlude – A Poem on Wisdom (28:1–28)
- Job's Summing Up (29:1–31:40)

The Dialogue section is composed in the format of poetry with distinctive syntax and grammar. Comparing the three cycles of debate, the third (and final) round can be seen as 'incomplete' because there is no speech from Zophar and the speech by Bildad is very short (6 verses only), which may indicate as a symptom of the disintegration of the friends' arguments. In response to Eliphaz, Job starts by speaking to God indirectly (in the third person), although it is spoken to his friends (chapter 23). Next (in chapter 24), Job addresses the issue of the oppression of the poor that Eliphaz had raised (Job 22:6-20). Job concurs that oppression exists, but questions why God does not act in judgment against the oppressors while listing the kind of actions and attitudes that Job regards as morally reprehensible (to be expanded in chapter 31.

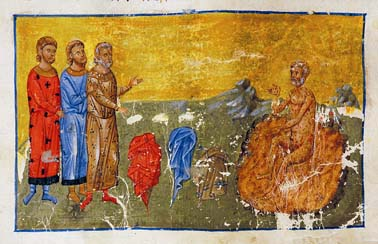
"Job and his friends". Book of Job in Illuminated Byzantine Manuscripts with Cyclic llustration (AD 1300). Greek Patriarchal Library, Jerusalem

== Job reflects on the oppression (24:1–17) ==
In this section, Job asks about the "times" and God's "days" when the wicked are allowed to oppress and prosper without punishment, followed by ample evidence:

- The wealthy, wicked people freely manipulate the means of wealth, such as by moving a landmark to claim possession of the land of others (Proverbs 23:10), thus depriving the oppressed of their ability to earn a living (verse 2) and by discriminating against the marginalized: the fatherless, the widow, and the poor (verses 3–4a).
- The poor, oppressed people suffer existential and personal affliction (verses 4b–12), such as by being made to hide themselves, only able to glean what is left behind in the field for food (verse 6), whereas their garment was taken in pledge for a loan (verses 7, 10a; picking up the detail of Eliphaz's speech in Job 22:6b), leaving them naked, hungry, and thirsty, but nonetheless forced to work, carrying sheaves and making olive oil and wine (verses 10–11). In summary, people (see Job 11:3) "groan under their oppression" (see Exodus 6, as well), and "the spirit of the wounded cry out for help" (verse 12).

Next are the more serious wrongdoings in the world against the wicked (verses 13–17): murder (verse 14), adultery (verse 15), and stealing (verse 16), in the same order of appearance in the Ten Commandments. The key image here is of darkness (verses 15, 16, 17) and light (verses 13, 14, 16), with a key implication that those who choose the paths of darkness are not caught or held to account, whereas God's light should expose them.

=== Verse 12 ===
[Job said:] "Men groan from outside the city,

and the soul of the wounded cries out;
yet God does not charge them with wrong."

- "Men": The Masoretic text literally reads, "From the city of men they groan." Most commentators change one vowel in מְתִים m'tim ("men") to get מֵתִים metim ("the dying"). Some English versions read: "the dying groan" (such as, "From out of the city the dying groan" in ESV).
- "With wrong": translated from the Hebrew noun תִּפְלָה tiflah ("folly" or "tastelessness", whereas the verb יָשִׂים yashim, normally meaning "to place" or "to put," would be rendered as "to impute" or "to charge." Some commentators have emended the text, changing the noun to תְּפִלָּה tefillah ("prayer"; the same term used to refer to Jewish prayer), then changing the verb יָשִׂים, yashim ("charges"), to יִשְׁמַע, yishmaʿ ("hears"), so it reads: "But God does not hear the prayer"—referring to the groans. The 'groan' here is comparable to the cries of the Israelites in their Egyptian bondage (Exodus 2:23–25).

== Job expounds the fate of the wicked (24:18–25) ==
Job knows that the wicked would be swallowed by Sheol or death (verse 19b) suddenly (verses 18–19a) and completely that they would be utterly forgotten, as if never existed (verses 20). However, before that happens, God seems to preserve and prolong the lives of such wicked (verse 22), who wrongfully treat childless women and widows (verse 21), even to give them security and protection for a "long time" (verse 23). Therefore, Job challenges his friends to prove him wrong about the examples he has given.

=== Verse 25 ===
[Job said:] "If it is not so, who will prove me a liar

and make my speech worth nothing?"

- "Nothing": translated from the Hebrew word אַל, ʾal, usually meaning "not", but here is used substantivally as "nothing".

Job dares his friends to disprove his argument that there is observable injustice in the world, but that God will eventually balance the scales of justice. Significantly, none of the three friends takes up Job's challenge.

== See also ==
- Charity
- Divine judgment
- Divine presence
- El Shaddai (God Almighty)
- Murder
- Poverty
- Robbery
- Theft
- Related Bible parts: Exodus 20, Deuteronomy 5, Job 23, Job 31

== Sources ==
- Alter, Robert (2010). The Wisdom Books: Job, Proverbs, and Ecclesiastes: A Translation with Commentary. W.W. Norton & Co. ISBN 978-0393080735.
- Coogan, Michael David (2007). Coogan, Michael David; Brettler, Marc Zvi; Newsom, Carol Ann; Perkins, Pheme (eds.). The New Oxford Annotated Bible with the Apocryphal/Deuterocanonical Books: New Revised Standard Version, Issue 48 (Augmented 3rd ed.). Oxford University Press. ISBN 9780195288810.
- Crenshaw, James L. (2007). "17. Job". In Barton, John; Muddiman, John (eds.). The Oxford Bible Commentary (first (paperback) ed.). Oxford University Press. pp. 331–355. ISBN 978-0199277186.
- Estes, Daniel J. (2013). Walton, John H.; Strauss, Mark L. (eds.). Job. Teach the Text Commentary Series. United States: Baker Publishing Group. ISBN 9781441242778.
- Farmer, Kathleen A. (1998). "The Wisdom Books". In McKenzie, Steven L.; Graham, Matt Patrick (eds.). The Hebrew Bible Today: An Introduction to Critical Issues. Westminster John Knox Press. ISBN 978-0-66425652-4.
- Halley, Henry H. (1965). Halley's Bible Handbook: an abbreviated Bible commentary (24th (revised) ed.). Zondervan Publishing House. ISBN 0-310-25720-4.
- Kugler, Robert; Hartin, Patrick J. (2009). An Introduction to the Bible. Eerdmans. ISBN 978-0-8028-4636-5.
- Walton, John H. (2012). Job. United States: Zondervan. ISBN 9780310492009.
- Wilson, Lindsay (2015). Job. United States: Wm. B. Eerdmans Publishing Company. ISBN 9781467443289.
- Würthwein, Ernst (1995). The Text of the Old Testament. Translated by Rhodes, Erroll F. Grand Rapids, MI: Wm. B. Eerdmans. ISBN 0-8028-0788-7.
