= Job 19 =

19th chapter of the Book of Job

- ← chapter 18 chapter 20 →
- The whole Book of Job in the Leningrad Codex (1008 C.E.) from an old facsimile edition.
- Book: Book of Job
- Hebrew Bible part: Ketuvim
- Order in the Hebrew part: 3
- Category: Sifrei Emet
- Christian Bible part: Old Testament
- Order in the Christian part: 18

Job 19 is the nineteenth chapter of the Book of Job in the Hebrew Bible or the Old Testament of the Christian Bible. The book is anonymous; most scholars believe it was written around 6th century BCE. This chapter records the speech of Job, which belongs to the Dialogue section of the book, comprising Job 3:1–31:40.

== Text ==
The original text is written in Hebrew language. This chapter is divided into 29 verses.

=== Textual witnesses ===
Some early manuscripts containing the text of this chapter in Hebrew are of the Masoretic Text, which includes the Aleppo Codex (10th century), and Codex Leningradensis (1008).

There is also a translation into Koine Greek known as the Septuagint, made in the last few centuries BC; some extant ancient manuscripts of this version include Codex Vaticanus (B; $\mathfrak{G}$^{B}; 4th century), Codex Sinaiticus (S; BHK: $\mathfrak{G}$^{S}; 4th century), and Codex Alexandrinus (A; $\mathfrak{G}$^{A}; 5th century).

== Analysis ==
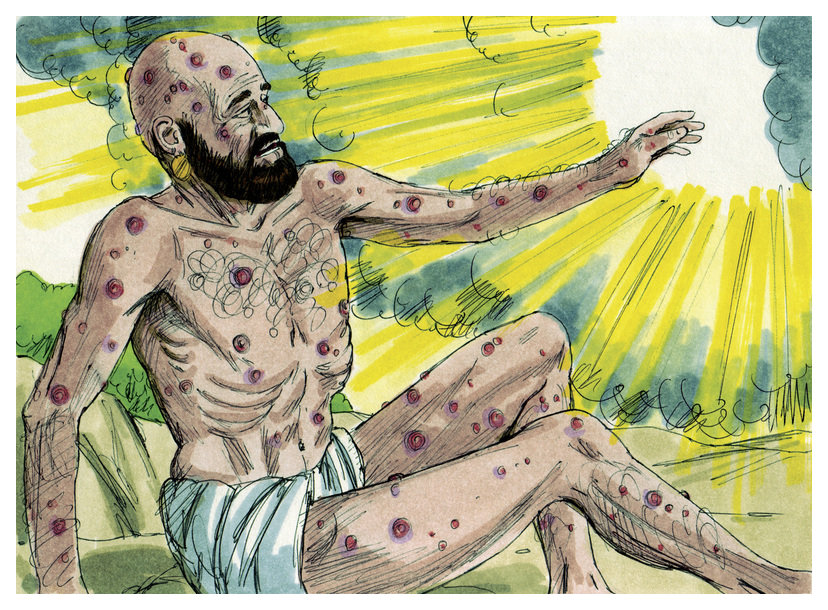
"Job". From: Biblical illustration of Book of Job Chapter 19, by Jim Padgett, courtesy of Sweet Publishing, Ft. Worth, TX, and Gospel Light, Ventura, CA (1984).

Job 19 is part of the dialogue between Job and his friends, which is found in chapters 3–31.

Chapter 19 can further be subdivided with:

- Job complains his friends' torments of him (verses 1–6)
- Job laments God's treatment to him (verses 7–12)
- Job laments people's abandonment of him (verses 13–20)
- Job pleads his friends to stop rebuking him (verses 21–22)
- Job explores the possibility of a redeemer (verses 23–27)
- Job warns his friends of judgment for mistreating him (verses 28–29)

== Job's lament to God and the people (19:1–22) ==
Job's lament in this section is framed by his complaint of his friends tormenting him (verses 1–6) and his plea for his friends to stop doing that action (verses 21–22). In between, Job laments that he no doubt believes God's ultimate power over his fate, but he simply cannot understand why God took away his dignity and reputation ("glory" and "crown", verse 9), also that his family and the people have deserted him ("his brothers", verse 13; "all who knew him", verses 13b, 14b), "closest friends" (verse 19), basically the entire community (cf. Job 30).

=== Verse 4 ===
[Job said:] "And if indeed I have erred,

my error remains with me."

- "I have erred": translated from the Hebrew verb שָׁגִיתִי, shagiti, is in the form of a hypothetical clause, because Job maintains his innocence.
- "My error": translated from the Hebrew word מְשׁוּגָה, meshugah (that can only be found here in the Hebrew Bible), derived from שׁוּג, shug ("to wander; to err") with a root paralleling שָׁגַג, shagag or שָׁגָה, shagah.

Job insists that even if it were true he has committed a minor, inadvertent sin (cf. Leviticus 5:18; Numbers 15:8), definitely not the intentional sin being accused by his friends, then it is solely Job concern, a matter between Job and God alone, not for his friends to prosecute him.

The Greek Septuagint version has an insertion between the two lines: "in having spoken words which it is not right to speak, and my words err, and are unreasonable".

== Job and his goel (19:23–27) ==
For I know that my Redeemer lives, and that at the last he will stand upon the earth; and after my skin has been thus destroyed, then in my flesh I shall see God.

— Job 19:25-26 (NRSV)

Verses 25-29 are notoriously difficult to translate. In verse 25, Job says that he has a גָּאַל (gôēl), which is something like "vindicator" but does not have an easy English equivalent. In earlier books such as the Book of Ruth, a gôēl is 'the near kinsman who will pay off one's debts, defend the family, avenge a killing, marry the widow of the deceased'. The concept might include the description of the mediator in Job 16:19. Proverbs 23 calls a gôēl the defender of widows and orphans, a champion of the oppressed. Job probably does not have in mind a human agent here, but rather something closer to a divine legal advocate, like the "umpire/arbiter" (Job 9:33) or "witness" (Job 16:19). From context, Job's gôēl is not God directly either, given that it is God that Job is defending himself from. Later Christian interpreters have seen this as prefiguring Jesus as an intermediary that pleads sinners' cases before God.

Verse 26 is also difficult to translate; the ancient versions and quotes differ. It seems to refer to Job being flayed, yet still seeing God. Some Christian interpreters see it as an affirmation of a coming resurrection, although this reading doesn't seem likely to have been the original intent. It could be read as Job's biggest desire being not justice or vindication, but the restoration of his relationship with God, even if it only comes after extreme hardship.

== Angry words (19:28-29) ==
These verses are difficult to understand or make sense of; possibly the text was damaged or misplaced. In particular, verse 29 seems to sound as if it comes from the friends rather than Job, although interpreters disagree. As far as can be guessed, Job is charging his friends with a desire to persecute him, but warns them of divine judgment for their wrongful treatment of him. A mysterious word "Shaddayan" is in the Masoretic Text, which is guessed at being a reference to a righteous judge or judgment, but scholars are unsure.

== See also ==
- Job 17, Job 42

== Sources ==
- Alter, Robert (2010). The Wisdom Books: Job, Proverbs, and Ecclesiastes: A Translation with Commentary. W.W. Norton & Co. ISBN 978-0393080735.
- Coogan, Michael David (2007). Coogan, Michael David; Brettler, Marc Zvi; Newsom, Carol Ann; Perkins, Pheme (eds.). The New Oxford Annotated Bible with the Apocryphal/Deuterocanonical Books: New Revised Standard Version, Issue 48 (Augmented 3rd ed.). Oxford University Press. ISBN 9780195288810.
- Crenshaw, James L. (2007). "17. Job". In Barton, John; Muddiman, John (eds.). The Oxford Bible Commentary (first (paperback) ed.). Oxford University Press. pp. 331–355. ISBN 978-0199277186.
- Estes, Daniel J. (2013). Walton, John H.; Strauss, Mark L. (eds.). Job. Teach the Text Commentary Series. United States: Baker Publishing Group. ISBN 9781441242778.
- Farmer, Kathleen A. (1998). "The Wisdom Books". In McKenzie, Steven L.; Graham, Matt Patrick (eds.). The Hebrew Bible Today: An Introduction to Critical Issues. Westminster John Knox Press. ISBN 978-0-66425652-4.
- Halley, Henry H. (1965). Halley's Bible Handbook: an abbreviated Bible commentary (24th (revised) ed.). Zondervan Publishing House. ISBN 0-310-25720-4.
- Kugler, Robert; Hartin, Patrick J. (2009). An Introduction to the Bible. Eerdmans. ISBN 978-0-8028-4636-5.
- Pope, Marvin H. (1965). Job. The Anchor Bible Series 15. Doubleday. LCCN 65-12361.
- Walton, John H. (2012). Job. United States: Zondervan. ISBN 9780310492009.
- Wilson, Lindsay (2015). Job. United States: Wm. B. Eerdmans Publishing Company. ISBN 9781467443289.
- Würthwein, Ernst (1995). The Text of the Old Testament. Translated by Rhodes, Erroll F. Grand Rapids, MI: Wm. B. Eerdmans. ISBN 0-8028-0788-7.
