= Job 20 =

20th chapter of the Book of Job

- ← chapter 19 chapter 21 →
- The whole Book of Job in the Leningrad Codex (1008 C.E.) from an old facsimile edition.
- Book: Book of Job
- Hebrew Bible part: Ketuvim
- Order in the Hebrew part: 3
- Category: Sifrei Emet
- Christian Bible part: Old Testament
- Order in the Christian part: 18

Job 20 is the twentieth chapter of the Book of Job in the Hebrew Bible or the Old Testament of the Christian Bible. The book is anonymous; most scholars believe it was written around 6th century BCE. This chapter records the speech of Zophar the Naamathite (one of Job's friends), which belongs to the Dialogue section of the book, comprising Job 3:1–31:40.

== Text ==
The original text is written in Hebrew language. This chapter is divided into 29 verses.

=== Textual witnesses ===
Some early manuscripts containing the text of this chapter in Hebrew are of the Masoretic Text, which includes the Aleppo Codex (10th century), and Codex Leningradensis (1008).

There is also a translation into Koine Greek known as the Septuagint, made in the last few centuries BCE; some extant ancient manuscripts of this version include Codex Vaticanus (B; $\mathfrak{G}$^{B}; 4th century), Codex Sinaiticus (S; BHK: $\mathfrak{G}$^{S}; 4th century), and Codex Alexandrinus (A; $\mathfrak{G}$^{A}; 5th century).

== Analysis ==
The structure of the book is as follows:

- The Prologue (chapters 1–2)
- The Dialogue (chapters 3–31)
- The Verdicts (32:1–42:6)
- The Epilogue (42:7–17)

Within the structure, chapter 20 is grouped into the Dialogue section with the following outline:

- Job's Self-Curse and Self-Lament (3:1–26)
- Round One (4:1–14:22)
- Round Two (15:1–21:34)
  - Eliphaz (15:1–35)
  - Job (16:1–17:16)
  - Bildad (18:1–21)
  - Job (19:1–29)
  - Zophar (20:1–29)
    - Zohar's Initial Response (20:1–3)
    - The Premature Death of the Wicked (20:4–11)
    - Sin Will Destroy (20:12–22)
    - How God Deals with the Wicked (20:23–29)
  - Job (21:1–34)
- Round Three (22:1–27:23)
- Interlude – A Poem on Wisdom (28:1–28)
- Job's Summing Up (29:1–31:40)

The Dialogue section is composed in the format of poetry with distinctive syntax and grammar.

Chapter 20 contains Zophar's second (and final) speech, which can be divided into several parts:

- Zophar's initial response (verses 1–3)
- The brevity of the wicked due to premature death (verses 4–11)
- The self-destructive nature of sin (using distinctive food imagery, verses 12–22)
- God's active wrath against the wicked (verses 23–29)

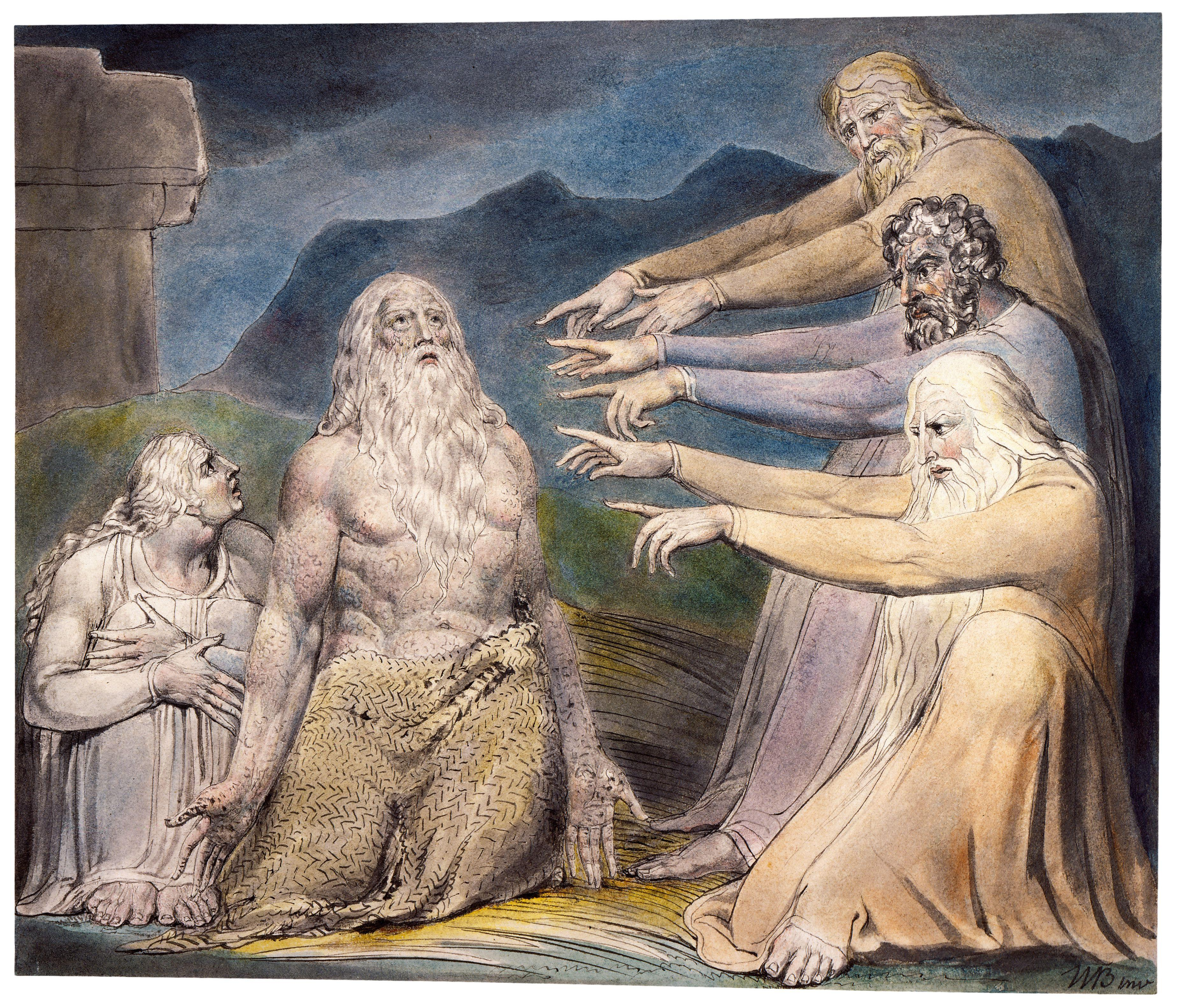
"Job Rebuked by His Friends". From: the Butts set (June 1805). The Morgan Library.

== Zophar's initial response (20:1–3) ==
In the opening part of the chapter, Zophar responds to Job's rebuke to the three friends (Job 19:28–29) with increasing impatience and growing "troubled thoughts" he felt as he listened to Job. Zophar claims that a "spirit from/out of his understandings answers me" (verse 3b), which prompts him to reply.

=== Verse 3 ===
[Zophar said:] "I have heard the rebuke that reproaches me,

And the spirit of my understanding causes me to answer."

- "Rebuke (that reproaches me)": literally "of my insulting correction" (cf. Job 19:3).
- "The spirit of my understanding": translated from the Hebrew phrase רוּחַ מִבִּינָתִי, ruakh mibbinati, literally "a spirit/wind/breath/impulse from my understanding".

These words (and also the opening statements of other friends of Job) tend to reveal that Job's friends seem more concerned about their wounded pride than about Job's grievous suffering.

== Zophar's explanation that the wicked will not escape God's wrath (20:4–29) ==
Zophar states his resolutely fixed position on the retribution theology in this final speech (Zophar would not participate in the third round of debate): "God always destroys the wicked". Like Bildad in the first round and Eliphaz in the second round (Job 15) of dialogue, Zophar appeals to tradition but in a more hyperbolic way to emphasize the certainty of his stance. Two themes are emphasized:

1. the shortness of time for the wicked to prevail.
2. the certainty of death for the wicked.

Zophar's traditional understanding weighs more that wickedness will reap destructive consequences (verses 14, 16, 18–19, 21; "self-destructive nature of human evil") than the involvement of God—despite the belief that God is still working behind the destructiveness. In the end, God will also show active wrath against the wicked, as an inheritance allotted to them (verse 29).

=== Verse 29 ===
[Zophar said:] "This is the wicked man’s portion from God,

and the inheritance appointed to him by God."

- "Appointed to him": translated from the Hebrew word אִמְרוֹ, ʾimro, which can be rendered as "his appointment" or "his word”; in combination with the word "inheritance" it can be translated as "his appointed heritage".

== See also ==
- Divine Providence
- Righteousness
- Related Bible parts: Job 19, Job 42

== Sources ==
- Alter, Robert (2010). The Wisdom Books: Job, Proverbs, and Ecclesiastes: A Translation with Commentary. W.W. Norton & Co. ISBN 978-0393080735.
- Coogan, Michael David (2007). Coogan, Michael David; Brettler, Marc Zvi; Newsom, Carol Ann; Perkins, Pheme (eds.). The New Oxford Annotated Bible with the Apocryphal/Deuterocanonical Books: New Revised Standard Version, Issue 48 (Augmented 3rd ed.). Oxford University Press. ISBN 9780195288810.
- Crenshaw, James L. (2007). "17. Job". In Barton, John; Muddiman, John (eds.). The Oxford Bible Commentary (first (paperback) ed.). Oxford University Press. pp. 331–355. ISBN 978-0199277186.
- Estes, Daniel J. (2013). Walton, John H.; Strauss, Mark L. (eds.). Job. Teach the Text Commentary Series. United States: Baker Publishing Group. ISBN 9781441242778.
- Farmer, Kathleen A. (1998). "The Wisdom Books". In McKenzie, Steven L.; Graham, Matt Patrick (eds.). The Hebrew Bible Today: An Introduction to Critical Issues. Westminster John Knox Press. ISBN 978-0-66425652-4.
- Halley, Henry H. (1965). Halley's Bible Handbook: an abbreviated Bible commentary (24th (revised) ed.). Zondervan Publishing House. ISBN 0-310-25720-4.
- Kugler, Robert; Hartin, Patrick J. (2009). An Introduction to the Bible. Eerdmans. ISBN 978-0-8028-4636-5.
- Walton, John H. (2012). Job. United States: Zondervan. ISBN 9780310492009.
- Wilson, Lindsay (2015). Job. United States: Wm. B. Eerdmans Publishing Company. ISBN 9781467443289.
- Würthwein, Ernst (1995). The Text of the Old Testament. Translated by Rhodes, Erroll F. Grand Rapids, MI: Wm. B. Eerdmans. ISBN 0-8028-0788-7.
