= Job 21 =

21st chapter of the Book of Job

- ← chapter 20 chapter 22 →
- The whole Book of Job in the Leningrad Codex (1008 C.E.) from an old facsimile edition.
- Book: Book of Job
- Hebrew Bible part: Ketuvim
- Order in the Hebrew part: 3
- Category: Sifrei Emet
- Christian Bible part: Old Testament
- Order in the Christian part: 18

Job 21 is the 21st chapter of the Book of Job in the Hebrew Bible or the Old Testament of the Christian Bible. The book is anonymous; most scholars believe it was written around the 6th century BCE. This chapter records the speech of Job, which belongs to the Dialogue section of the book, comprising Job 3:1–31:40.

== Text ==
The original text is written in Biblical Hebrew, and the chapter is divided into 34 verses.

=== Textual witnesses ===
Some early manuscripts containing the text of this chapter in Hebrew are of the Masoretic Text, which includes the Aleppo Codex (10th century) and Codex Leningradensis (1008).

There is also a translation into Koine Greek known as the Septuagint, which was made in the final few centuries BCE; some extant ancient manuscripts of this version include Codex Vaticanus (B; $\mathfrak{G}$^{B}; 4th century), Codex Sinaiticus (S; BHK: $\mathfrak{G}$^{S}; 4th century), and Codex Alexandrinus (A; $\mathfrak{G}$^{A}; 5th century).

== Analysis ==
The structure of the book is as follows:

- The Prologue (chapters 1–2)
- The Dialogue (chapters 3–31)
- The Verdicts (32:1–42:6)
- The Epilogue (42:7–17)

Within the structure, chapter 21 is grouped into the Dialogue section with the following outline:

- Job's Self-Curse and Self-Lament (3:1–26)
- Round One (4:1–14:22)
- Round Two (15:1–21:34)
  - Eliphaz (15:1–35)
  - Job (16:1–17:16)
  - Bildad (18:1–21)
  - Job (19:1–29)
  - Zophar (20:1–29)
  - Job (21:1–34)
    - Change Your Attitude to Me (21:1–6)
    - The Prospering of the Wicked (21:7–16)
    - Why Are the Wicked Not Punished? (21:17–26)
    - The Failure of the Friends (21:27–34)
- Round Three (22:1–27:23)
- Interlude – A Poem on Wisdom (28:1–28)
- Job's Summing Up (29:1–31:40)

The Dialogue section is composed and formatted as poetry with distinctive syntax and grammar.

Chapter 21 contains Job's last speech in the second cycle of debates with his friends, notably the only speech in which "Job confines his remarks to his friends". The chapter can be divided into the following parts:

- Job's plea to the friends to change their attitude (verses 1–6)
- Job questions why the wicked prosper (verses 7–16)
- Job asks how often the wicked are punished (verses 17–26)
- Job remarks on the failure of the friends' rebuttals (verses 27–34)

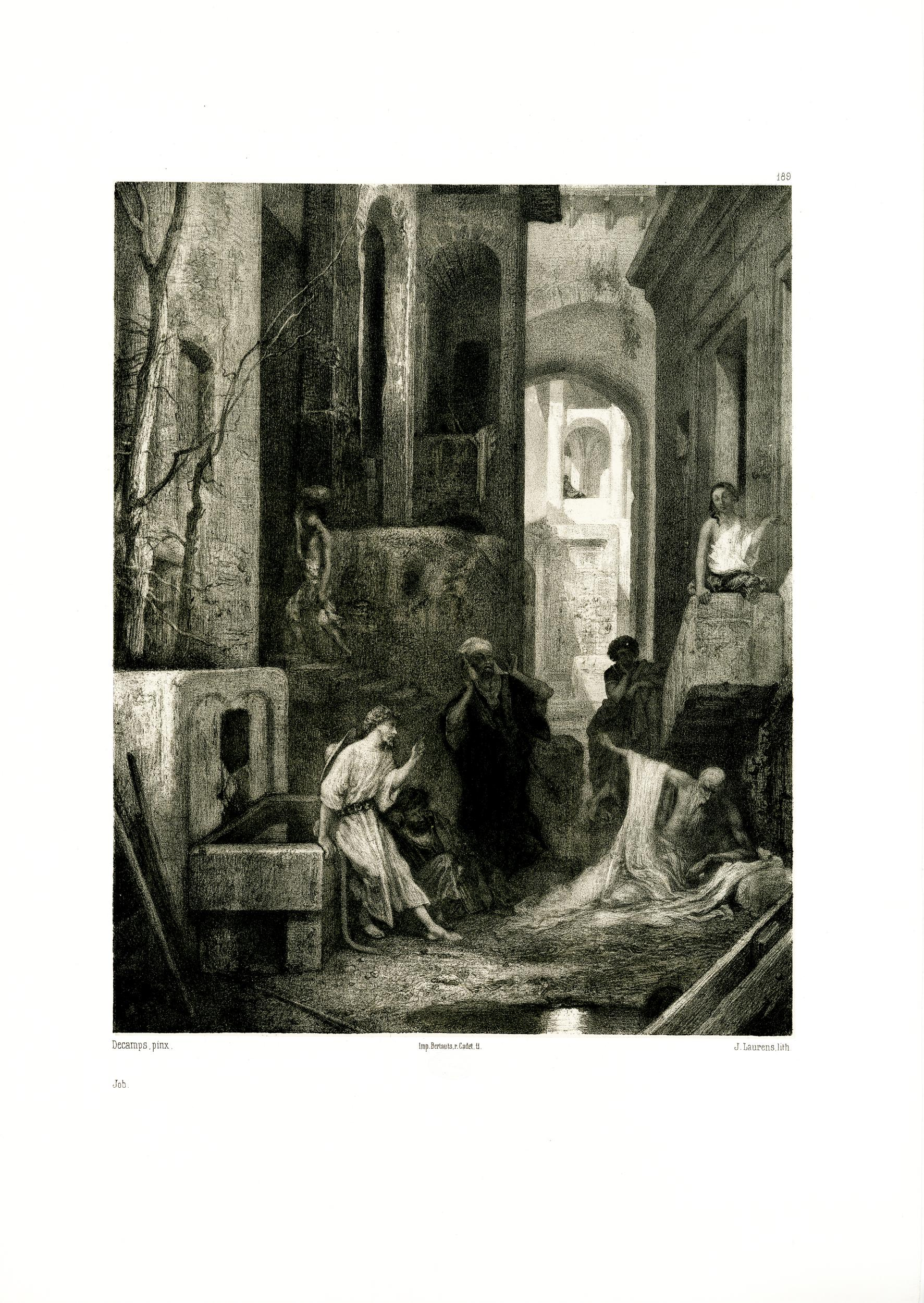
"Job". Print made by: Jules Laurens (c. 1849–1862). After: Alexandre Gabriel Decamps. British Museum.

== Job's plea to the friends to change their attitude (21:1–6) ==
Job opens his speech with a plea for his friends to actually listen (instead of "mock") his words because if they were doing that, it would bring real comfort to him (verses 2–3). Job's issue is that the friends are interfering with his complaint with God with their inaccurate presumption or silence toward his defense (verses 4–5). The task of laying a complaint before an almighty God is dangerous. Hence, Job approaches this with trembling (verse 6).

=== Verse 4 ===
[Job said:] "As for me, is my complaint against man?

And if it were, why should I not be impatient?"

- "Why should I not be impatient": literally in Hebrew: "Why should my spirit/breath not be short" (cf. Numbers 21:4; Judges 16:16). Job knows that his complaint is with God, not with any human beings, therefore he hopes that his friends would be his allies, but they instead add to Job's trauma by accusing him.

== Job explores why the wicked are not always punished as the friends insisted (21:7–26) ==
This section has two main parts in which Job explores the apparent anomalies of what the friends stated about the fate of the wicked:

1. Why the wicked can prosper despite their attitude toward God (verses 7–16)
2. How often the wicked are punished (verses 17–26)

Job is suspicious of any attempt to trim the facts to fit into a 'tidy theological system', and he confronts the friends to match their neat imaginary world with the reality. Verse 7 contains the statement of the general problem for the first topic: "why the wicked not only exist but also live a long life ("advance to old age") and grow mighty in power and wealth". The second topic is framed by the 'reality of death' (verses 17–18 and verses 25–26) as Job asks "how often do the wicked die prematurely" in a series of rhetorical questions with the expected answer: "hardly ever". The implication of both topics is the arbitrariness (lack of connection) between 'a person's righteousness and the fullness of that person's life', thus the divine retribution is not actually reflected in the world.

=== Verse 16 ===
[Job said:] "Lo, their good is not in their hand: the counsel of the wicked is far from me."

- "Is not in their hand": implying that one's well-being is from God, although the wicked may enjoy prosperity as if it is their right.
- "The counsel of the wicked is far from me" or "far be from me their counsel'; an echo of Psalm 1:1 to prove that Job is not in the company of the wicked.

== Job remarks on the failure of the friends' rebuttals (21:27–34) ==
After challenging the friends' thinking process, Job criticizes them for being blind and deaf to reality because of their rigid theological systems.(verses 29–33). Job closes the second round of debate by pointing out the insubstantiality of his friends' comfort until now ('mere hot air') and the faithlessness or treachery of what is left standing in their speeches (verse 34).

=== Verse 29 ===
[Job said:] "Have you not asked them who travel the road?

And do you not know their signs?"

- "Know their signs" refers to the custom of ancient merchants and travelers to write their names and thoughts (what they have seen and heard) somewhere at the main cross-roads; for example, the main roads of Sinai are 'dotted with these scribblings made by such passers of a day.'

The Greek Septuagint version renders the verse as: “Ask those who go by the way, and do not disown their signs.”

== See also ==
- Cattle
- Divine Providence
- Harp
- Last Judgment
- Righteousness
- Timbrel
- Related Bible parts: Job 20, Job 42, Psalm 1

== Sources ==
- Alter, Robert (2010). The Wisdom Books: Job, Proverbs, and Ecclesiastes: A Translation with Commentary. W.W. Norton & Co. ISBN 978-0393080735.
- Coogan, Michael David (2007). Coogan, Michael David; Brettler, Marc Zvi; Newsom, Carol Ann; Perkins, Pheme (eds.). The New Oxford Annotated Bible with the Apocryphal/Deuterocanonical Books: New Revised Standard Version, Issue 48 (Augmented 3rd ed.). Oxford University Press. ISBN 9780195288810.
- Crenshaw, James L. (2007). "17. Job". In Barton, John; Muddiman, John (eds.). The Oxford Bible Commentary (first (paperback) ed.). Oxford University Press. pp. 331–355. ISBN 978-0199277186.
- Estes, Daniel J. (2013). Walton, John H.; Strauss, Mark L. (eds.). Job. Teach the Text Commentary Series. United States: Baker Publishing Group. ISBN 9781441242778.
- Farmer, Kathleen A. (1998). "The Wisdom Books". In McKenzie, Steven L.; Graham, Matt Patrick (eds.). The Hebrew Bible Today: An Introduction to Critical Issues. Westminster John Knox Press. ISBN 978-0-66425652-4.
- Halley, Henry H. (1965). Halley's Bible Handbook: an abbreviated Bible commentary (24th (revised) ed.). Zondervan Publishing House. ISBN 0-310-25720-4.
- Kugler, Robert; Hartin, Patrick J. (2009). An Introduction to the Bible. Eerdmans. ISBN 978-0-8028-4636-5.
- Walton, John H. (2012). Job. United States: Zondervan. ISBN 9780310492009.
- Wilson, Lindsay (2015). Job. United States: Wm. B. Eerdmans Publishing Company. ISBN 9781467443289.
- Würthwein, Ernst (1995). The Text of the Old Testament. Translated by Rhodes, Erroll F. Grand Rapids, MI: Wm. B. Eerdmans. ISBN 0-8028-0788-7.
