= Job 16 =

16th chapter of the Book of Job

- ← chapter 15 chapter 17 →
- The whole Book of Job in the Leningrad Codex (1008 C.E.) from an old facsimile edition.
- Book: Book of Job
- Hebrew Bible part: Ketuvim
- Order in the Hebrew part: 3
- Category: Sifrei Emet
- Christian Bible part: Old Testament
- Order in the Christian part: 18

Job 16 is the sixteenth chapter of the Book of Job in the Hebrew Bible or the Old Testament of the Christian Bible. The book is anonymous; most scholars believe it was written around 6th century BCE. This chapter records the speech of Job, which belongs to the Dialogue section of the book, comprising Job 3:1–31:40.

== Text ==
The original text is written in Hebrew language. This chapter is divided into 22 verses.

=== Textual witnesses ===
Some early manuscripts containing the text of this chapter in Hebrew are of the Masoretic Text, which includes the Aleppo Codex (10th century), and Codex Leningradensis (1008).

There is also a translation into Koine Greek known as the Septuagint, made in the last few centuries BC; some extant ancient manuscripts of this version include Codex Vaticanus (B; $\mathfrak{G}$^{B}; 4th century), Codex Sinaiticus (S; BHK: $\mathfrak{G}$^{S}; 4th century), and Codex Alexandrinus (A; $\mathfrak{G}$^{A}; 5th century).

== Analysis ==
The structure of the book is as follows:

- The Prologue (chapters 1–2)
- The Dialogue (chapters 3–31)
- The Verdicts (32:1–42:6)
- The Epilogue (42:7–17)

Within the structure, chapter 16 is grouped into the Dialogue section with the following outline:

- Job's Self-Curse and Self-Lament (3:1–26)
- Round One (4:1–14:22)
- Round Two (15:1–21:34)
  - Eliphaz (15:1–35)
  - Job (16:1–17:16)
    - You Are Miserable Comforters (16:1–5)
    - Lamenting His Lot (16:6–17)
    - The Possibility of a Heavenly Witness (16:18–22)
    - A Lack of Hope (17:1–2)
    - Speaking to God (17:3–5)
    - Complaining to the Friends (17:6–10)
    - Job's Present Despair (17:11–16)
  - Bildad (18:1–21)
  - Job (19:1–29)
  - Zophar (20:1–29)
  - Job (21:1–34)
- Round Three (22:1–27:23)
- Interlude – A Poem on Wisdom (28:1–28)
- Job's Summing Up (29:1–31:40)

The Dialogue section is composed in the format of poetry with distinctive syntax and grammar.

Chapter 16 consists of three parts:

- Job regards his friends as "miserable comforters" (verses 1–5)
- Job laments how God is treating him (verses 6–17)
- Job considers 'the possibility of a heavenly witness' (verses 18–22)

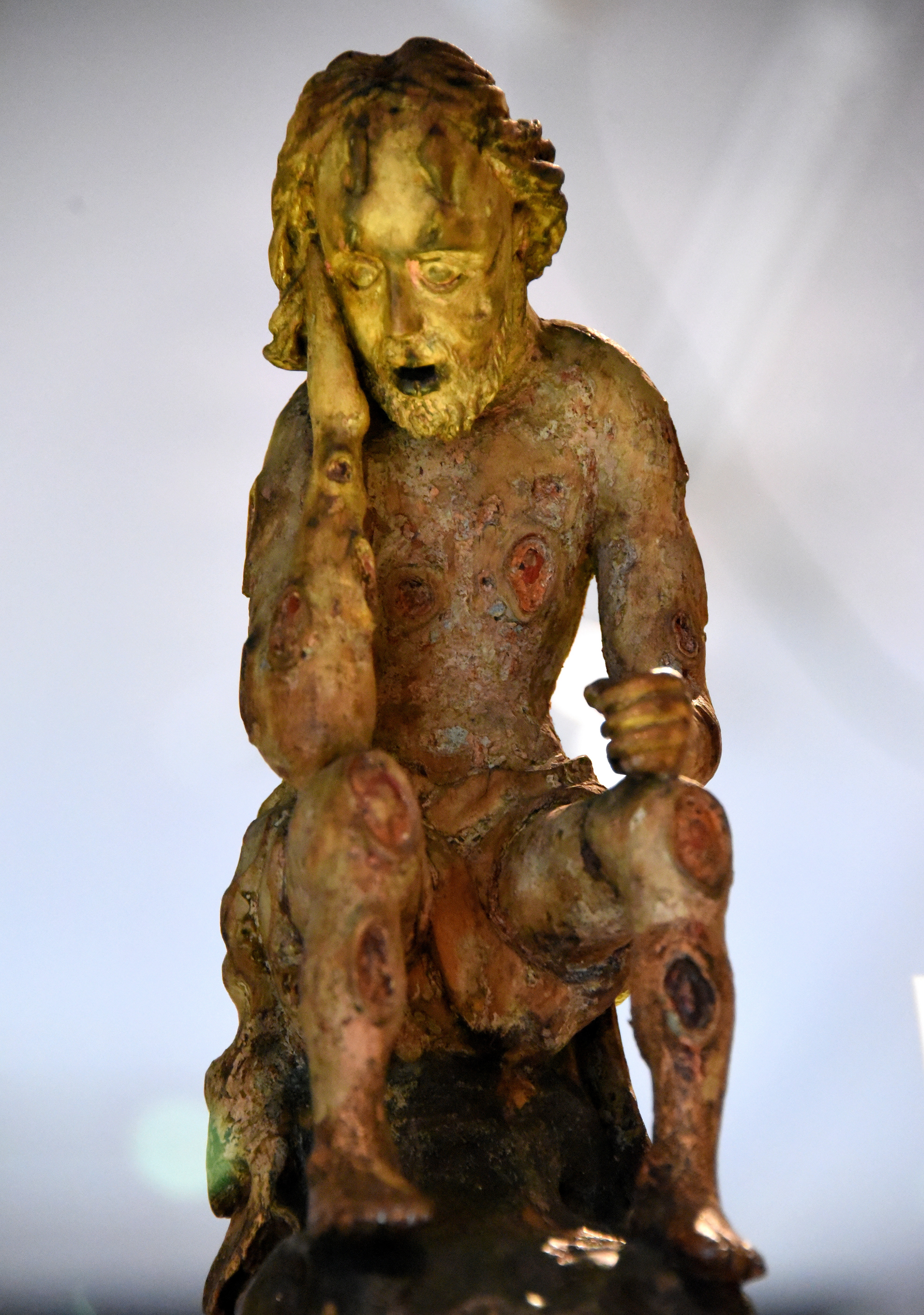
Carved wooden figure of Job. Probably from Germany, 1750-1850 CE. The Wellcome Collection, London.

== Job reflects on his friends as miserable comforters (16:1–5) ==
Job starts his first speech in the second round of the conversation with his friends with a complaint that all of them are miserable comforters, giving him nothing new as he has heard many things like what they said (verse 2a) and he also was able to speak as they did (verse 4a). Job points out that the friends string words together while shaking their head, not in sympathy but in derision, against him (cf. Psalm 22:7; 109:25), instead of saying something useful as he would do if he were in their shoes (verse 5).

=== Verse 5 ===
[Job said:] "I could strengthen you with my mouth,

and the solace of my lips would assuage your pain."

- "Assuage": translated from the Hebrew verb יַחְשֹׂךְ, yakhsokh, meaning "to restrain; to withhold". If their roles were reversed, Job would provide his friends with words of solace in their pain, not accusations that rub salt into the wounds, as they have done thus far to Job.

== Job complains of God's treatment and wishes help from a heavenly witness (16:6–22) ==
Job states that his pain is not eased by speaking or by not speaking about it, as he firmly believes God is in charge of the world and treats Job as God pleases (verses 12–14). Therefore, Job called for help from a heavenly figure, who will argue Job's case with God (verse 21; cf. Job 9:33; 19:25; 31:35).

=== Verse 20 ===
My friends scorn me,
but I pour out my tears to God.

=== Verse 21 ===
[Job said:] "Oh, that one might plead for a man with God,

as a man pleads for his neighbor!"

- "As a man pleads": the word "a man" is translated from the Hebrew expression "son of man" (בן־אדם, ḇen-’āḏām).
- "Neighbor": or "friend".

== See also ==
- Divine retribution
- Prayer
- Righteousness
- Sackcloth
- Sin
- Suffering
- Related Bible parts: Job 9, Job 15, Job 31

== Sources ==
- Alter, Robert (2010). The Wisdom Books: Job, Proverbs, and Ecclesiastes: A Translation with Commentary. W.W. Norton & Co. ISBN 978-0393080735.
- Coogan, Michael David (2007). Coogan, Michael David; Brettler, Marc Zvi; Newsom, Carol Ann; Perkins, Pheme (eds.). The New Oxford Annotated Bible with the Apocryphal/Deuterocanonical Books: New Revised Standard Version, Issue 48 (Augmented 3rd ed.). Oxford University Press. ISBN 9780195288810.
- Crenshaw, James L. (2007). "17. Job". In Barton, John; Muddiman, John (eds.). The Oxford Bible Commentary (first (paperback) ed.). Oxford University Press. pp. 331–355. ISBN 978-0199277186.
- Estes, Daniel J. (2013). Walton, John H.; Strauss, Mark L. (eds.). Job. Teach the Text Commentary Series. United States: Baker Publishing Group. ISBN 9781441242778.
- Farmer, Kathleen A. (1998). "The Wisdom Books". In McKenzie, Steven L.; Graham, Matt Patrick (eds.). The Hebrew Bible Today: An Introduction to Critical Issues. Westminster John Knox Press. ISBN 978-0-66425652-4.
- Halley, Henry H. (1965). Halley's Bible Handbook: an abbreviated Bible commentary (24th (revised) ed.). Zondervan Publishing House. ISBN 0-310-25720-4.
- Kugler, Robert; Hartin, Patrick J. (2009). An Introduction to the Bible. Eerdmans. ISBN 978-0-8028-4636-5.
- Walton, John H. (2012). Job. United States: Zondervan. ISBN 9780310492009.
- Wilson, Lindsay (2015). Job. United States: Wm. B. Eerdmans Publishing Company. ISBN 9781467443289.
- Würthwein, Ernst (1995). The Text of the Old Testament. Translated by Rhodes, Erroll F. Grand Rapids, MI: Wm. B. Eerdmans. ISBN 0-8028-0788-7.
