= Tel Qasile ostraca =

Ancient Middle Eastern artifacts

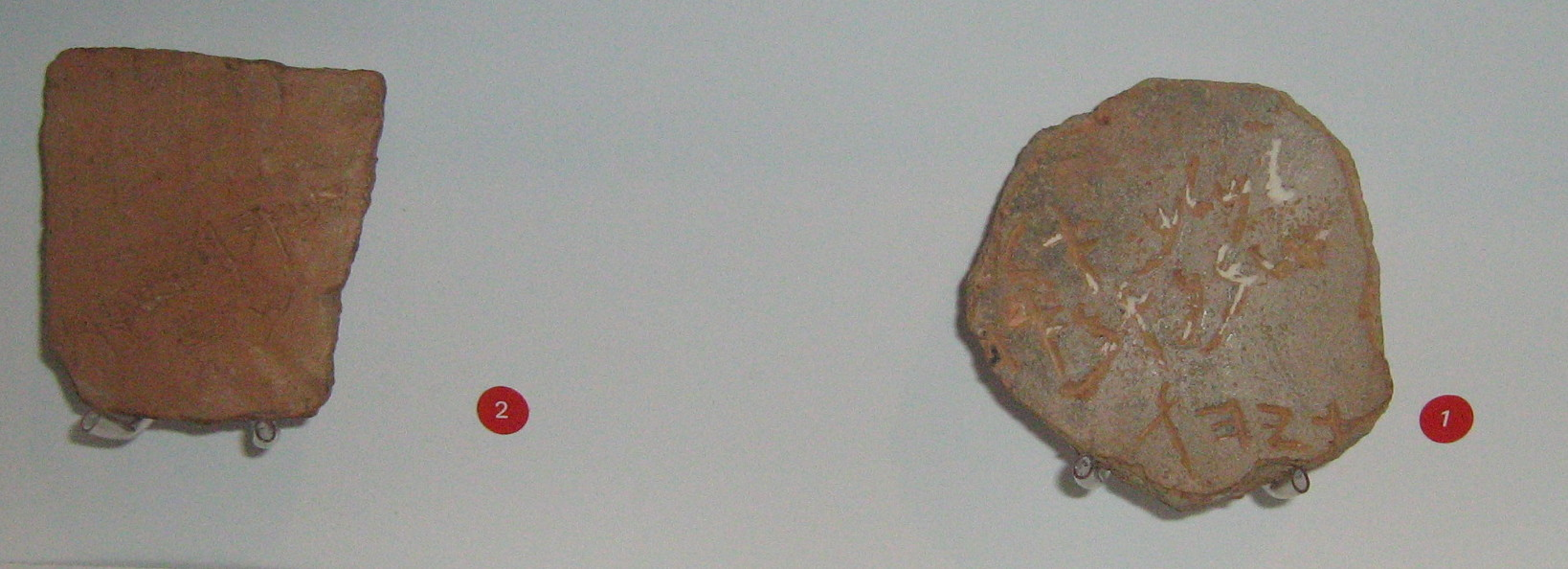
The ostraca on special exhibition in Tel Aviv in 2009. On the right, (1) is the Hiyahu ostracon, and on the left (2) is the Beth-horon sherd

The Tel Qasile ostraca are two small ostraca (pottery fragments with writing on them) found at Tell Qasile, then part of Mandatory Palestine, in 1945–46. The longer of the two ostraca is known as the Beth-horon sherd, on the basis of a possible reference to the biblical site of Bethoron. The Beth-horon sherd is now at the Israel Museum in Jerusalem.

== Discovery ==
The two inscribed ostraca were found on the surface of the southwestern slope of the hill, separately by Jacob Kaplan and Robert Hoff, prior to any excavations. The excavations which subsequently took place between 1948 and 1950 on the same site were carried out in a careful stratigraphic sequence, but no further inscriptions were found.

== Inscriptions ==
The ostraca read:

- Hiyahu ostracon: "For the king. One thousand and one hundred [log] of oil. Hiyahu" (about 550 litres, or 145 US gallons)
- Beth-horon sherd: "Gold of Ophir to Beth Horon 30 Shekels" (about 225 g, or 7.2 troy oz)

== Custody ==
Both ostraca were in private hands for the first few years after their discovery, as neither finder reported them to the Palestine Department of Antiquities. Having put the Beth-Horon sherd up for sale in 1951, Hoff was threatened with a lawsuit by the Israeli government – he subsequently agreed to sell it to them for IL3,000. As of 2001, the Hiyahu ostracon remained in private hands.

== See also ==
- Job 22:24
- Ophir
