= Job 23 =

23rd chapter of the Book of Job

- ← chapter 22 chapter 24 →
- The whole Book of Job in the Leningrad Codex (1008 C.E.) from an old facsimile edition.
- Book: Book of Job
- Hebrew Bible part: Ketuvim
- Order in the Hebrew part: 3
- Category: Sifrei Emet
- Christian Bible part: Old Testament
- Order in the Christian part: 18

Job 23 is the 23rd chapter of the Book of Job in the Hebrew Bible or the Old Testament of the Christian Bible. The book is anonymous; most scholars believe it was written around 6th century BCE. This chapter records the speech of Job, which belongs to the Dialogue section of the book, comprising Job 3:1–31:40.

== Text ==
The original text is written in Hebrew language. This chapter is divided into 17 verses.

=== Textual witnesses ===
Some early manuscripts containing the text of this chapter in Hebrew are of the Masoretic Text, which includes the Aleppo Codex (10th century), and Codex Leningradensis (1008).

There is also a translation into Koine Greek known as the Septuagint, made in the last few centuries BC; some extant ancient manuscripts of this version include Codex Vaticanus (B; $\mathfrak{G}$^{B}; 4th century), Codex Sinaiticus (S; BHK: $\mathfrak{G}$^{S}; 4th century), and Codex Alexandrinus (A; $\mathfrak{G}$^{A}; 5th century).

== Analysis ==
The structure of the book is as follows:

- The Prologue (chapters 1–2)
- The Dialogue (chapters 3–31)
- The Verdicts (32:1–42:6)
- The Epilogue (42:7–17)

Within the structure, chapter 23 is grouped into the Dialogue section with the following outline:

- Job's Self-Curse and Self-Lament (3:1–26)
- Round One (4:1–14:22)
- Round Two (15:1–21:34)
- Round Three (22:1–27:23)
  - Eliphaz (22:1–30)
  - Job (23:1–24:25)
    - Pondering Litigation against God (23:1–7)
    - Searching for a Terrifying God (23:8–17)
    - Reflecting on Oppression (24:1–12)
    - Serious Wrongdoing (24:13–17)
    - The Fate of the Wicked (24:18–20)
    - The Prospering of the Wicked (24:21–24)
    - A Final Challenge to the Friends (24:25)
  - Bildad (25:1–6)
  - Job (26:1–27:23)
- Interlude – A Poem on Wisdom (28:1–28)
- Job's Summing Up (29:1–31:40)

The Dialogue section is composed in the format of poetry with distinctive syntax and grammar. Comparing the three cycles of debate, the third (and final) round can be seen as 'incomplete', because there is no speech from Zophar and the speech by Bildad is very short (6 verses only), which may indicate as a symptom of disintegration of the friends' arguments. In response to Eliphaz, Job starts by speaking to God indirectly (as third person) although it is spoken to his friends (chapter 23), before he addresses Eliphaz directly (chapter 24) on the issues raised in chapter 22. In chapter 23, Job again ponders on the possible legal case against God (verses 1–7), but he is terrified on the prospect of facing God, which he desperately seeks but cannot see (verses 8–9), yet he believes God knows all Job's way and will complete the purposes in Job's life (verses 10–14), so Job testifies that he both is longing and is afraid of God's presence (verses 15–17).

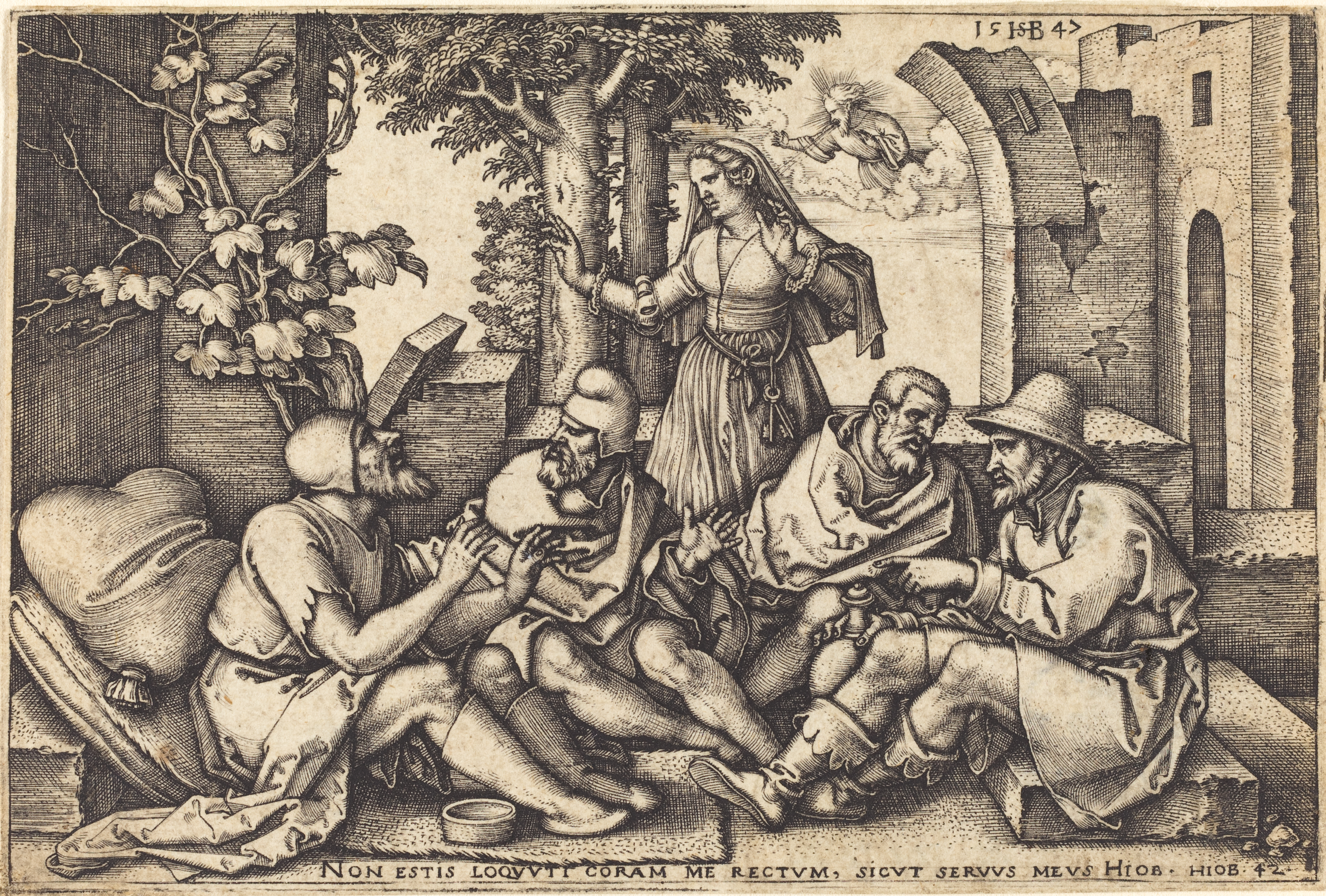
"Job Conversing with His Friends". Engraving by Sebald Beham (1547).

== Job ponders the litigation against God (23:1–7) ==
The language of litigation is prominent in this section, as Job revisits a possibility of a legal action to get a vindication. Job does not intend to achieve victory in the case, but his ultimate goal is to prove how righteous God's judgment is (verse 7).

=== Verse 7 ===
[Job said:] "There an upright man could argue with him,

and I would be acquitted forever by my judge."

- "Argue": or "present one's case", from the Niphal form of the Hebrew verb נוֹכָח, nokhakh ("argue, present a case"), which will give a sense of "engaging discussion," "arguing a case," and "settling a dispute." Job is confident that God will treat him justly as an impartial judge.

== Job searches the terrifying God (23:8–17) ==
This section describes Job's search for God which is framed by the absence (verses 8–9) and the presence (verses 15–17) of God. Job understands that God's purpose in him must be fulfilled (verse 14) before Job can face Him. However, Job then realizes how terrified he would feel when he finally can achieve his wish of being in the presence of God.

=== Verses 16–17 ===
[Job said:] "^{16} For God makes my heart soft,

and the Almighty troubles me;

^{17}because I was not cut off from the presence of darkness,

nor has He covered the darkness from my face"

- "Soft": translated from the Hebrew verb Hebrew: הֵרַךְ, herakh, meaning "to be tender", and in the Piel form can be rendered as "to soften"; here is in parallel with the verbs for "fear", so having the sense of becoming "fearful"
- "Covered”; translated from the Hebrew verb Hebrew: נִצְמַתִּי, nitsmatti, which can be rendered as "I have been silent" (as in Arabic and Aramaic languages), so in the negative sense of the sentence it means that he has not been silent.

== See also ==
- Divine judgment
- Divine presence
- Related Bible parts: Job 22, Job 31

== Sources ==
- Alter, Robert (2010). The Wisdom Books: Job, Proverbs, and Ecclesiastes: A Translation with Commentary. W.W. Norton & Co. ISBN 978-0393080735.
- Coogan, Michael David (2007). Coogan, Michael David; Brettler, Marc Zvi; Newsom, Carol Ann; Perkins, Pheme (eds.). The New Oxford Annotated Bible with the Apocryphal/Deuterocanonical Books: New Revised Standard Version, Issue 48 (Augmented 3rd ed.). Oxford University Press. ISBN 9780195288810.
- Crenshaw, James L. (2007). "17. Job". In Barton, John; Muddiman, John (eds.). The Oxford Bible Commentary (first (paperback) ed.). Oxford University Press. pp. 331–355. ISBN 978-0199277186.
- Estes, Daniel J. (2013). Walton, John H.; Strauss, Mark L. (eds.). Job. Teach the Text Commentary Series. United States: Baker Publishing Group. ISBN 9781441242778.
- Farmer, Kathleen A. (1998). "The Wisdom Books". In McKenzie, Steven L.; Graham, Matt Patrick (eds.). The Hebrew Bible Today: An Introduction to Critical Issues. Westminster John Knox Press. ISBN 978-0-66425652-4.
- Halley, Henry H. (1965). Halley's Bible Handbook: an abbreviated Bible commentary (24th (revised) ed.). Zondervan Publishing House. ISBN 0-310-25720-4.
- Kugler, Robert; Hartin, Patrick J. (2009). An Introduction to the Bible. Eerdmans. ISBN 978-0-8028-4636-5.
- Walton, John H. (2012). Job. United States: Zondervan. ISBN 9780310492009.
- Wilson, Lindsay (2015). Job. United States: Wm. B. Eerdmans Publishing Company. ISBN 9781467443289.
- Würthwein, Ernst (1995). The Text of the Old Testament. Translated by Rhodes, Erroll F. Grand Rapids, MI: Wm. B. Eerdmans. ISBN 0-8028-0788-7.
