= Job 22 =

22nd chapter of the Book of Job

- ← chapter 21 chapter 23 →
- The whole Book of Job in the Leningrad Codex (1008 C.E.) from an old facsimile edition.
- Book: Book of Job
- Hebrew Bible part: Ketuvim
- Order in the Hebrew part: 3
- Category: Sifrei Emet
- Christian Bible part: Old Testament
- Order in the Christian part: 18

Job 22 is the 22nd chapter of the Book of Job in the Hebrew Bible or the Old Testament of the Christian Bible. The book is anonymous; most scholars believe it was written around 6th century BCE. This chapter records the speech of Job, which belongs to the Dialogue section of the book, comprising Job 3:1–31:40.

== Text ==
The original text is written in Hebrew language. This chapter is divided into 30 verses.

=== Textual witnesses ===
Some early manuscripts containing the text of this chapter in Hebrew are of the Masoretic Text, which includes the Aleppo Codex (10th century), and Codex Leningradensis (1008).

There is also a translation into Koine Greek known as the Septuagint, made in the last few centuries BC; some extant ancient manuscripts of this version include Codex Vaticanus (B; $\mathfrak{G}$^{B}; 4th century), Codex Sinaiticus (S; BHK: $\mathfrak{G}$^{S}; 4th century), and Codex Alexandrinus (A; $\mathfrak{G}$^{A}; 5th century).

== Analysis ==
The structure of the book is as follows:

- The Prologue (chapters 1–2)
- The Dialogue (chapters 3–31)
- The Verdicts (32:1–42:6)
- The Epilogue (42:7–17)

Within the structure, chapter 22 is grouped into the Dialogue section with the following outline:

- Job's Self-Curse and Self-Lament (3:1–26)
- Round One (4:1–14:22)
- Round Two (15:1–21:34)
- Round Three (22:1–27:23)
  - Eliphaz (22:1–30)
    - Job's Offenses (22:1–11)
    - God's Knowledge and Power (22:12–20)
    - Urging Job to Repent (22:21–30)
  - Job (23:1–24:25)
  - Bildad (25:1–6)
  - Job (26:1–27:23)
- Interlude – A Poem on Wisdom (28:1–28)
- Job's Summing Up (29:1–31:40)

The Dialogue section is composed in the format of poetry with distinctive syntax and grammar. Comparing the three cycles of debate, the third (and final) round can be seen as 'incomplete', because there is no speech from Zophar and the speech by Bildad is very short (6 verses only), which may indicate as a symptom of disintegration of the friends' arguments. In his last speech of the book (chapter 22), Eliphaz becomes more direct in his accusation of Job as a sinner, even further than the position of Bildad and Zophar, by confronting Job with a list of alleged offenses (verses 1–11) in contrast to God's knowledge and power (verses 12–20), so at the end Eliphaz urges Job to repent (verses 21–30).

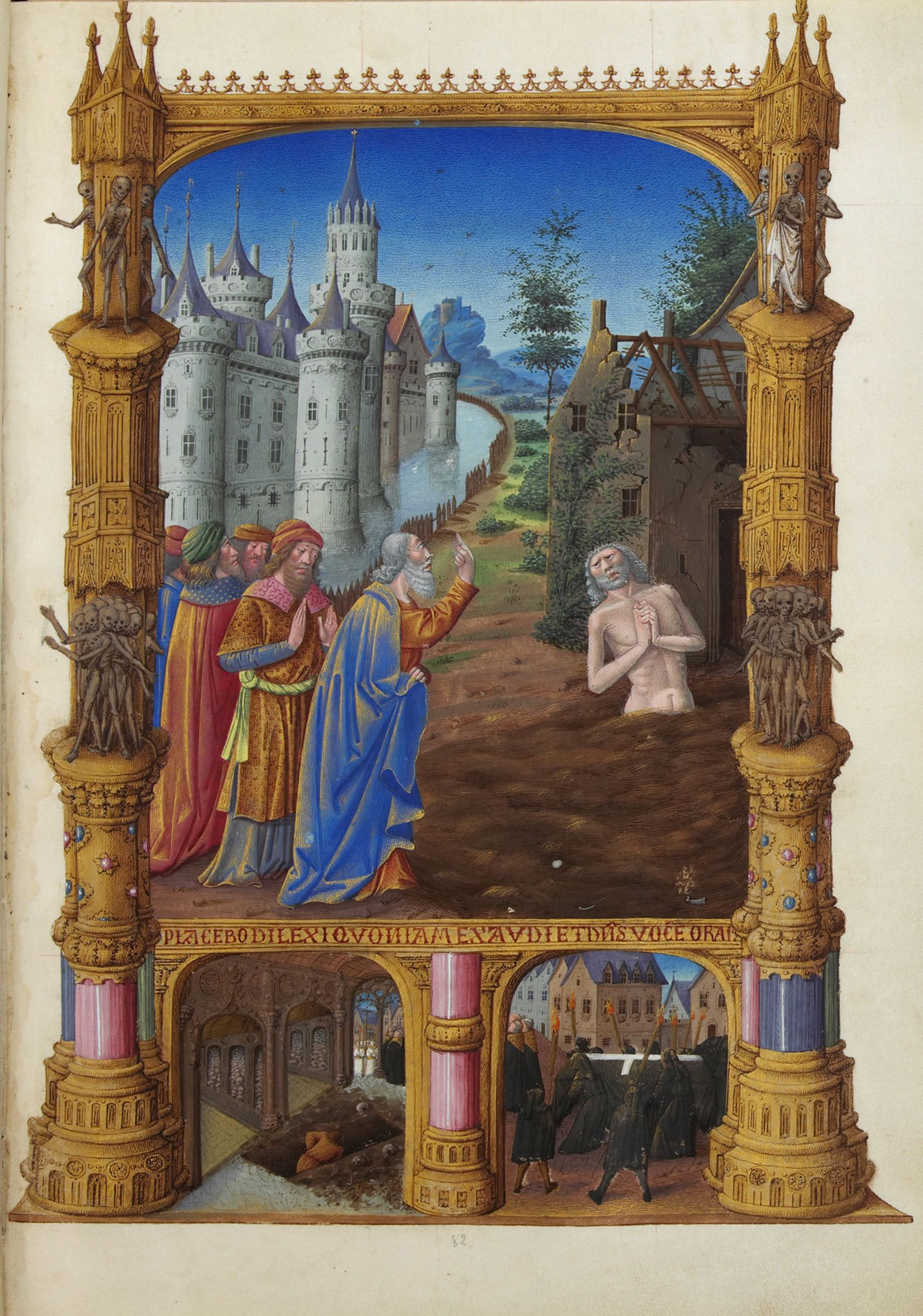
"Job Mocked by His Friends". From: Les Très Riches Heures du duc de Berry, Folio 82r. Musée Condé, Chantilly.

== Eliphaz lists Job's offenses (22:1–11) ==
Although Eliphaz opens his speech with a gentle tone, he soon attacks Job for having a defective piety toward God ("fear of God"), which could be Job's attempt to bribe God into overlooking his real wickedness (verse 4). It is followed by a string of accusations (summary in verse 5, illustrations in verses 6–11) that Job could have sinned, betraying Eliphaz' steep belief in the retribution theology that only great guilt can explain Job's great suffering. Job will specifically denied all of these charges in his oath of clearance in chapter 31.

=== Verse 4 ===
[Eliphaz said:] "Is it because of your fear of Him that He corrects you,

and enters into judgment with you?"

- "Your fear of Him": or "your piety", a reference to Job's reverence to God. The expected answer of the question is that God does not punish Job because he is righteous, but because he must be unrighteous.

== Eliphaz urges Job to acknowledge God's knowledge and repent from his sins (22:12–30) ==
In the first part of this section Eliphaz describes God's majesty (verse 12) to counter what he perceived as Job's claim of God as having limited knowledge and unable to see through deep darkness, so unable to properly judge. Eliphaz concludes that Job must be guilty by association, as he describes the wicked and implies that Job must be like them (verses 15–20). Finally, Eliphaz outlines the way for Job to return to God, that is, beyond the initial returning also to receive instruction (tora or Torah) (Note: On Job 22:22: This is the only occurrence of the word "Torah" (תּוֹרָ֑ה in the whole book of Job. Wilson 2015, p. 119) from God and place His words in his heart (verse 22); a good advice which is misdirected – it is Eliphaz that will need to follow it (Job 42:7–9), instead of Job. Eliphaz' tidy analysis and advice are unfortunately based on a misdiagnosis of Job's situation and with this speech, Eliphaz seems to run out of arguments as his part in the dialogue is grinding to a halt (verse 29).

=== Verse 24 ===
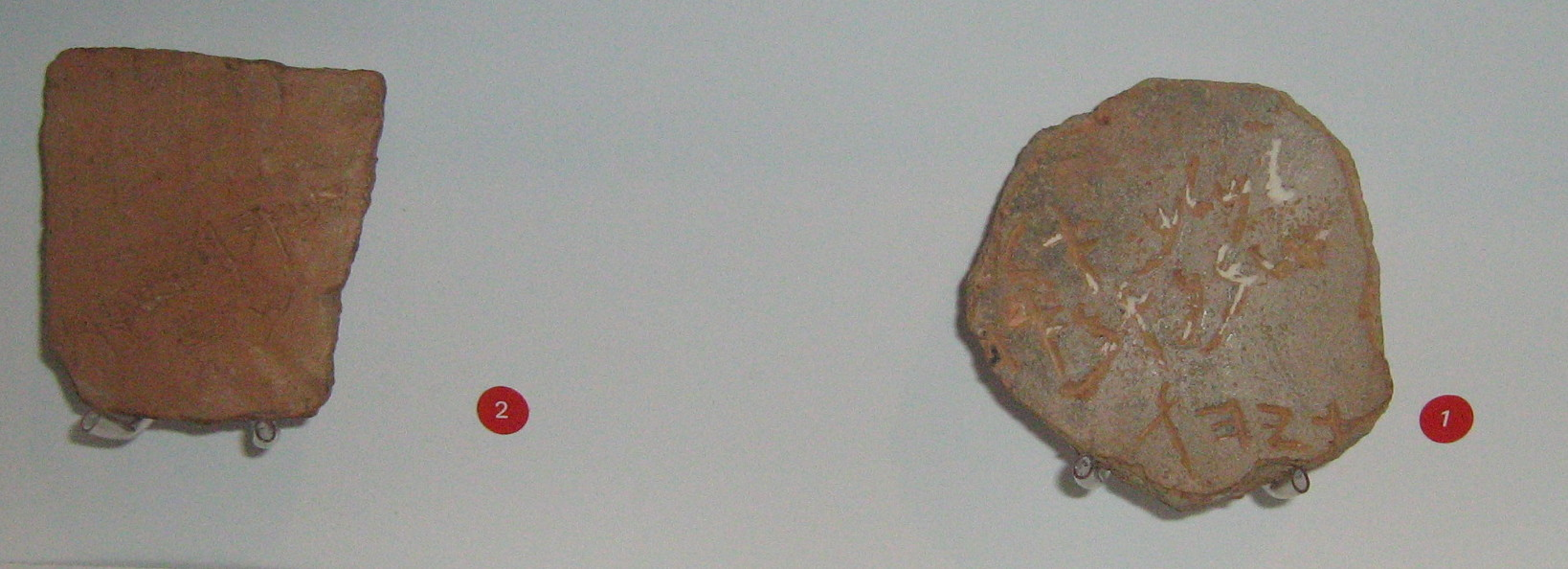
Tel Qasile ostraca on special exhibition in Tel Aviv in 2009. On the left (2) is the Beth-horon sherd with the text that reads: "Gold of Ophir to Beth Horon 30 Shekels".

[Eliphaz said:] "Then you will lay up gold as dust,

and the gold of Ophir as the stones of the brooks."

- "Gold of Ophir": renowned in the ancient writings as 'very-high-quality gold', although the location of Ophir is debated. An ostracon from 8th century BC mentioning "gold of Ophir" written in Paleo-Hebrew alphabet was found at the archaeological site Tell Qasile near Tel Aviv.

=== Verse 29 ===
[Eliphaz said:] "When men are cast down, and you say, ‘There is a time of exaltation!’

then He will save the humble person."

- "There is time of exaltation": translated from the single Hebrew word Hebrew: גֵּוָה, gê-wāh, which can mean "loftiness; pride"; here the word can be rendered as simply saying "up" or "pride" (cf. "It is because of pride" in ESV).
- "Humble”; in Hebrew literally "the lowly of eyes".

== See also ==
- Ophir
- Righteousness
- Torah
- Related Bible parts: Job 21, Job 42

== Sources ==
- Alter, Robert (2010). The Wisdom Books: Job, Proverbs, and Ecclesiastes: A Translation with Commentary. W.W. Norton & Co. ISBN 978-0393080735.
- Coogan, Michael David (2007). Coogan, Michael David; Brettler, Marc Zvi; Newsom, Carol Ann; Perkins, Pheme (eds.). The New Oxford Annotated Bible with the Apocryphal/Deuterocanonical Books: New Revised Standard Version, Issue 48 (Augmented 3rd ed.). Oxford University Press. ISBN 9780195288810.
- Crenshaw, James L. (2007). "17. Job". In Barton, John; Muddiman, John (eds.). The Oxford Bible Commentary (first (paperback) ed.). Oxford University Press. pp. 331–355. ISBN 978-0199277186.
- Estes, Daniel J. (2013). Walton, John H.; Strauss, Mark L. (eds.). Job. Teach the Text Commentary Series. United States: Baker Publishing Group. ISBN 9781441242778.
- Farmer, Kathleen A. (1998). "The Wisdom Books". In McKenzie, Steven L.; Graham, Matt Patrick (eds.). The Hebrew Bible Today: An Introduction to Critical Issues. Westminster John Knox Press. ISBN 978-0-66425652-4.
- Halley, Henry H. (1965). Halley's Bible Handbook: an abbreviated Bible commentary (24th (revised) ed.). Zondervan Publishing House. ISBN 0-310-25720-4.
- Kugler, Robert; Hartin, Patrick J. (2009). An Introduction to the Bible. Eerdmans. ISBN 978-0-8028-4636-5.
- Walton, John H. (2012). Job. United States: Zondervan. ISBN 9780310492009.
- Wilson, Lindsay (2015). Job. United States: Wm. B. Eerdmans Publishing Company. ISBN 9781467443289.
- Würthwein, Ernst (1995). The Text of the Old Testament. Translated by Rhodes, Erroll F. Grand Rapids, MI: Wm. B. Eerdmans. ISBN 0-8028-0788-7.
