= Job 17 =

17th chapter of the Book of Job

- ← chapter 16 chapter 18 →
- The whole Book of Job in the Leningrad Codex (1008 C.E.) from an old facsimile edition.
- Book: Book of Job
- Hebrew Bible part: Ketuvim
- Order in the Hebrew part: 3
- Category: Sifrei Emet
- Christian Bible part: Old Testament
- Order in the Christian part: 18

Job 17 is the seventeenth chapter of the Book of Job in the Hebrew Bible or the Old Testament of the Christian Bible. The book is anonymous; most scholars believe it was written around 6th century BCE. This chapter records the speech of Job, which belongs to the Dialogue section of the book, comprising Job 3:1–31:40.

== Text ==
The original text is written in Hebrew language. This chapter is divided into 16 verses.

=== Textual witnesses ===
Some early manuscripts containing the text of this chapter in Hebrew are of the Masoretic Text, which includes the Aleppo Codex (10th century), and Codex Leningradensis (1008).

There is also a translation into Koine Greek known as the Septuagint, made in the last few centuries BC; some extant ancient manuscripts of this version include Codex Vaticanus (B; $\mathfrak{G}$^{B}; 4th century), Codex Sinaiticus (S; BHK: $\mathfrak{G}$^{S}; 4th century), and Codex Alexandrinus (A; $\mathfrak{G}$^{A}; 5th century).

== Analysis ==
The structure of the book is as follows:

- The Prologue (chapters 1–2)
- The Dialogue (chapters 3–31)
- The Verdicts (32:1–42:6)
- The Epilogue (42:7–17)

Within the structure, chapter 17 is grouped into the Dialogue section with the following outline:

- Job's Self-Curse and Self-Lament (3:1–26)
- Round One (4:1–14:22)
- Round Two (15:1–21:34)
  - Eliphaz (15:1–35)
  - Job (16:1–17:16)
    - You Are Miserable Comforters (16:1–5)
    - Lamenting His Lot (16:6–17)
    - The Possibility of a Heavenly Witness (16:18–22)
    - A Lack of Hope (17:1–2)
    - Speaking to God (17:3–5)
    - Complaining to the Friends (17:6–10)
    - Job's Present Despair (17:11–16)
  - Bildad (18:1–21)
  - Job (19:1–29)
  - Zophar (20:1–29)
  - Job (21:1–34)
- Round Three (22:1–27:23)
- Interlude – A Poem on Wisdom (28:1–28)
- Job's Summing Up (29:1–31:40)

The Dialogue section is composed in the format of poetry with distinctive syntax and grammar.

Chapter 17 lacks a clear structure with some verses a continuation from the previous chapter and the complaints addressed alternately to God and Job's friends:

- Job's anguish (verses 1–2), continuing from Job 16:18–22.
- Job complains to God (verses 3–5)
- Job complains to his friends (verses 6–10)
- Job sinks back to his present despair (verses 11–16).

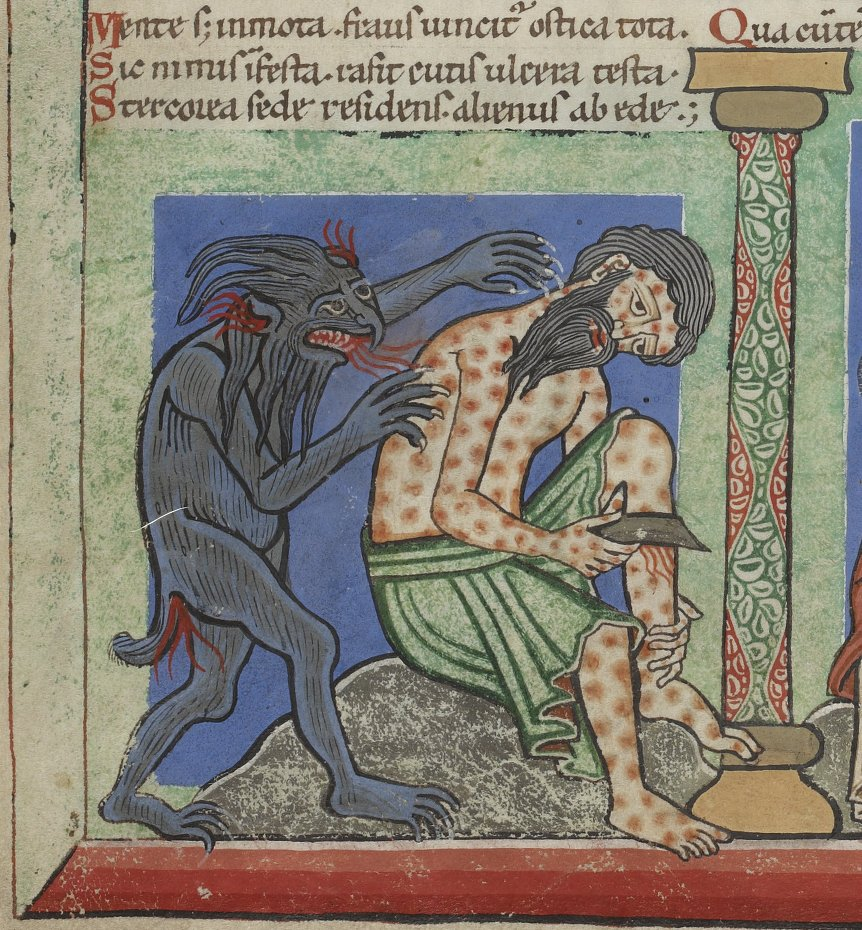
"Job on the Dunghill is Afflicted with Leprosy to the Dismay of His Friends". Medieval.

== Job complains for the lack of hope (17:1–10) ==
The section opens with the anguish of the previous chapter, both in Job's expectation of death (verse 1; cf. Job 16:22) and by the useless, mocking words of his friends (verse 2; cf. Job 16:20). Thereafter, Job addresses God directly, asking why God has closed the minds of his friends to understanding Job's plight (verse 4). Then, Job turns to his friends (or onlookers; "among you" or "all of you", verse 10) and conveying his dismay that God, who runs the world, belittles him in the presence of ("spit in the face" or "spit in front of") others (verse 6), before closing with charging his friends for lacking wisdom in their responses (verse 10).

=== Verse 6 ===
[Job said:] "And He has made me a byword of the people,

someone in whose face they spit."

- “Byword”: is related to the Hebrew word translated as "proverb” (מָשָׁל, mashal).
- "Spit": from the Hebrew word תֹפֶת, tofet, which is only found here in the Hebrew Bible. The whole expression in the second line can be rendered as "and a spitting in/to the face I have become" or "I have become one in whose face people spit".

== Job expresses his despair (17:11–16) ==
In this section Job sinks back to his current despair, as if his life were over ("my days are past") and there is no future for his "plans" or "desires" (verse 11). Job imagines that he would go "over to the dark side" (the darkness of Sheol) to make his "house" (or "bed"; verse 13), where he seems to belong. Job diligently searches for a way forward in the present darkness, but concedes that this does not seem to be feasible (verse 16).

=== Verse 16 ===
[Job said:] "Will they go down to the gates of Sheol?

Shall we have rest together in the dust?"

- "Will they": the phrase is assumed from the plural form of the verb, which probably refers to the two words (or the two senses of the word) in the preceding verse: "hope" and "what hope produces", which may perish with Job.
- "Gates": from the Hebrew word בַּדִּים, baddim, literally "bars" or "bolts", to describe the "gates of Sheol".
- "Sheol": or "the abode of the dead".
- "Shall (we)": from the Hebrew conjunction אִם, ʾim, which confirms the interrogative interpretation.
- "Rest" follows the Greek Septuagint and the Syriac versions with the change of vocalization in the Masoretic Text as the Hebrew noun “rest,” can be rendered to, "will our rest be together in the dust?" The verb נָחַת, nakhat, in Aramaic means “to go down; to descend,” so if this is the preferred reading, it would be spelled נֵחַת, nekhat, in Hebrew; in either case the verse clearly describes "death" and the process of "going to the grave".

Job realizes that death cannot return his children to him, cannot restore to him a sense of family (cf. Job 3:17–19; 7:9; Psalm 6:5).

== See also ==
- Divine retribution
- Mockery
- Flattery
- Grave (burial)
- Hypocrisy
- Prayer
- Putrefaction
- Righteousness
- Sackcloth
- Sin
- Suffering
- Death
- Related Bible parts: Job 16, Job 31

== Sources ==
- Alter, Robert (2010). The Wisdom Books: Job, Proverbs, and Ecclesiastes: A Translation with Commentary. W.W. Norton & Co. ISBN 978-0393080735.
- Coogan, Michael David (2007). Coogan, Michael David; Brettler, Marc Zvi; Newsom, Carol Ann; Perkins, Pheme (eds.). The New Oxford Annotated Bible with the Apocryphal/Deuterocanonical Books: New Revised Standard Version, Issue 48 (Augmented 3rd ed.). Oxford University Press. ISBN 9780195288810.
- Crenshaw, James L. (2007). "17. Job". In Barton, John; Muddiman, John (eds.). The Oxford Bible Commentary (first (paperback) ed.). Oxford University Press. pp. 331–355. ISBN 978-0199277186.
- Estes, Daniel J. (2013). Walton, John H.; Strauss, Mark L. (eds.). Job. Teach the Text Commentary Series. United States: Baker Publishing Group. ISBN 9781441242778.
- Farmer, Kathleen A. (1998). "The Wisdom Books". In McKenzie, Steven L.; Graham, Matt Patrick (eds.). The Hebrew Bible Today: An Introduction to Critical Issues. Westminster John Knox Press. ISBN 978-0-66425652-4.
- Halley, Henry H. (1965). Halley's Bible Handbook: an abbreviated Bible commentary (24th (revised) ed.). Zondervan Publishing House. ISBN 0-310-25720-4.
- Kugler, Robert; Hartin, Patrick J. (2009). An Introduction to the Bible. Eerdmans. ISBN 978-0-8028-4636-5.
- Walton, John H. (2012). Job. United States: Zondervan. ISBN 9780310492009.
- Wilson, Lindsay (2015). Job. United States: Wm. B. Eerdmans Publishing Company. ISBN 9781467443289.
- Würthwein, Ernst (1995). The Text of the Old Testament. Translated by Rhodes, Erroll F. Grand Rapids, MI: Wm. B. Eerdmans. ISBN 0-8028-0788-7.
