= Tell Qasile =

Archaeological site in Tel Aviv, Israel

- Location within Israel
- 32°6′5.76″N 34°47′23.2″E
- Location: Israel

Tell Qasile is an archaeological site near the Yarkon River in Tel Aviv, Israel. Over 3,000 years old, the site contains the remains of a port city founded by the Philistines in the 12th century BC.

Prior to 1948, it was on the village lands of Al-Shaykh Muwannis, which was depopulated in the 1948 war. The first excavations at the site began in 1948, while the war was still ongoing. Today it is located on the grounds of the Eretz Israel Museum, which was built in 1953.

== Identification suggestions ==
At first it was suggested to identify Tell Qasila with "Glil Yam", a place mentioned on an inscription of Tiglath-Pileser III. A later suggestion was to identify it with the phrase from the Book of Joshua "Mi Yarkon", stating it is a city and not a stream.

== Excavation history ==
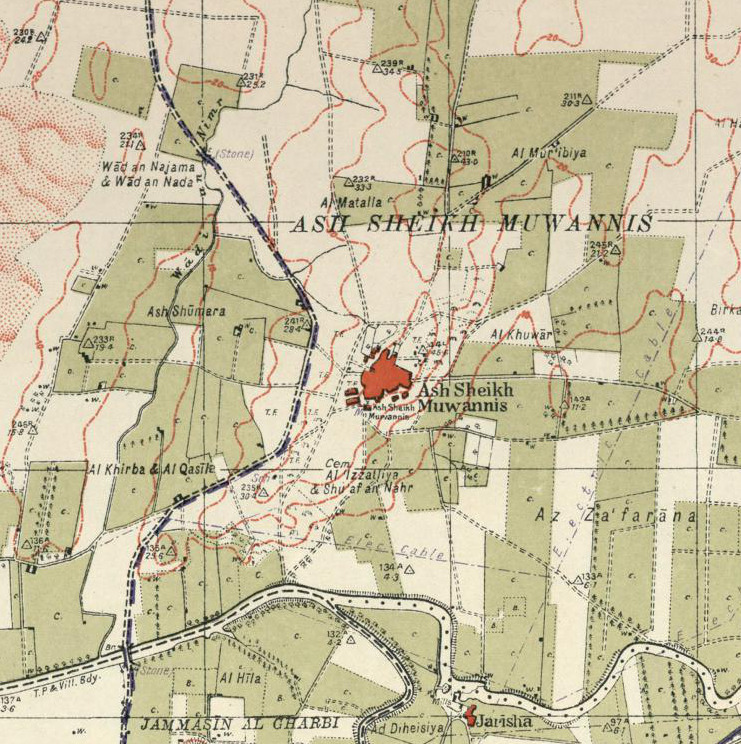
Tel Qasile (the small hill in the bottom left square) shown in a 1940s Survey of Palestine map of the village lands of al-Shaykh Muwannis

The site was referred to as el-Khurby, meaning "the ruins". In the early 19th century, British traveller and adventurer Lady Hester Stanhope acquired a document describing a hoard of gold coins buried in Ashkelon; she led an expedition in 1815 to dig in search of the treasure. After digging at Ashkelon Stanhope instructed Charles Meryon, who accompanied her on her travels as her personal doctor, to explore el-Khurby as it was also mentioned in the document. No digging took place as Meyron judged it impractical, but noted "there were many proofs that this district was once highly populous".

Two important ostraca were discovered at the site in 1945–46 by Jacob Kaplan and Robert Hoff.

Benjamin Mazar led excavations at Tell Qasile between 1948 and 1950. Though it was not the first archaeological excavation in the newly founded state, Mazar received the first permit to excavate.

In the 1950s the Haaretz Museum (later renamed the Eretz Israel Museum) was established adjacent to the tell, with the mound in the middle of the museum area. In 1955 a Byzantine grave was found by chance which led to another excavation at the tell. In 1957 another excavation was conducted by Jacob Kaplan who uncovered two Hasmonean rock cut tombs. Further excavations were held in 1959.

Amihai Mazar, Benjamin Mazar's nephew, directed later excavations at the site in 1971 to 1974 and again from 1982 to 1990. The excavations revealed a Philistine temple and the gradual development of the Philistine city over 150 years, from its founding (Level XII) to the peak of its growth (Level X) at the end of the 11th century BC.

During building works initiated by Rehavam Ze'evi at the Eretz Israel Museum in the 1980s a Byzantine mosaic was destroyed; Ze'evi was questioned by police over the destruction.

== Archaeological findings ==
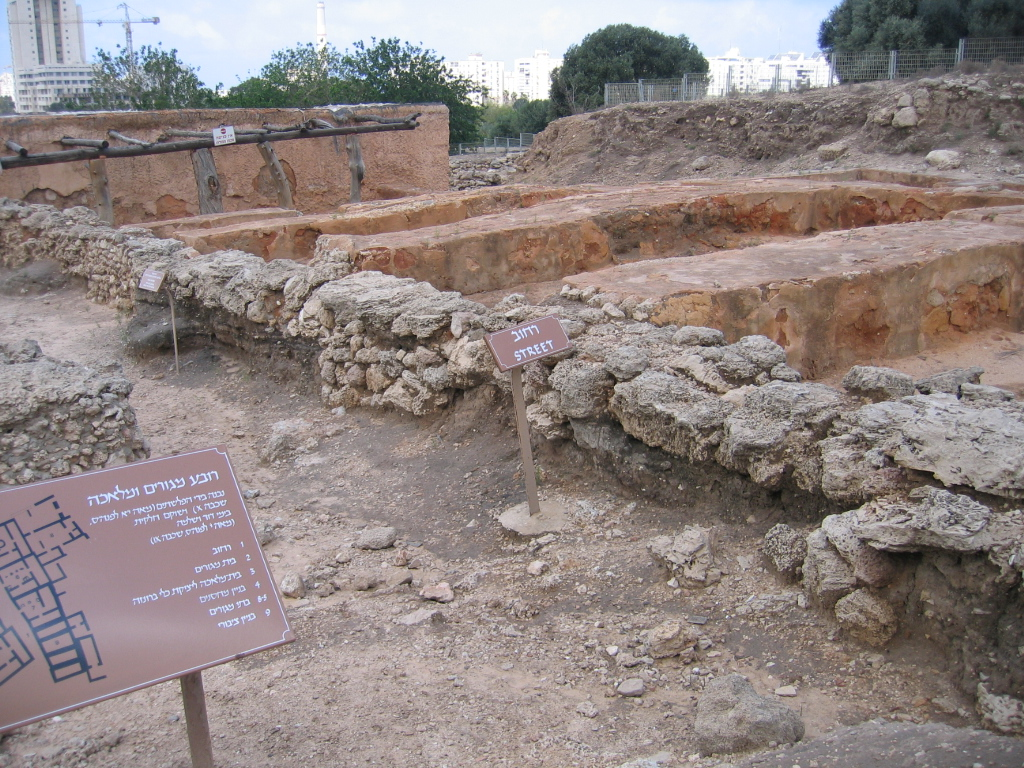
Residential quarter, Tel Qasile

The temples were constructed with walls of sun-dried mud bricks covered with light-colored plaster. Low benches were built along the length of the walls. Many offering and cult vessels were found on the floors, concentrated mainly around the "bamah" and in the storage alcoves of the temples. A residential block was found on the north side of the street, while in the south side workshops and storehouses were unearthed. The houses were built to a standard plan - they were square, with an area of approximately 100 square meters per apartment. Each apartment comprised two rectangular rooms with a courtyard separating them.

== History ==
=== Iron Age ===
==== Caravanserai ====
Excavations in the 1980s revealed a large courtyard building, dating from the Abbasid era. The building has been dated by its excavators to a period between the ninth and eleventh century, though both earlier (Umayyad) and later (Crusader) occupations of the site were found. The design of the building and its position (at a river crossing point), indicate that it was a caravanserai.

Only the northern part of the building was excavated, the rest only visible as robber trenches. From the excavated parts, it is estimated that the building was 28 meters square. A paved entrance in the middle of the north wall led to a courtyard, paved with gravel. The courtyard had arcades on the east and west sides, supported by columns. In the northwest corner of the courtyard were the remains of a staircase. Several small rooms lining the courtyard were exposed.
