= Job 15 =

15th chapter of the Book of Job

- ← chapter 14 chapter 16 →
- The whole Book of Job in the Leningrad Codex (1008 C.E.) from an old facsimile edition.
- Book: Book of Job
- Hebrew Bible part: Ketuvim
- Order in the Hebrew part: 3
- Category: Sifrei Emet
- Christian Bible part: Old Testament
- Order in the Christian part: 18

Job 15 is the fifteenth chapter of the Book of Job in the Hebrew Bible or the Old Testament of the Christian Bible. The book is anonymous; most scholars believe it was written around 6th century BCE. This chapter records the speech of Eliphaz the Temanite (one of Job's friends), which belongs to the Dialogue section of the book, comprising Job 3:1–31:40.

== Text ==
The original text is written in Hebrew language. This chapter is divided into 35 verses.

=== Textual witnesses ===
Some early manuscripts containing the text of this chapter in Hebrew are of the Masoretic Text, which includes the Aleppo Codex (10th century), and Codex Leningradensis (1008).

There is also a translation into Koine Greek known as the Septuagint, made in the last few centuries BC; some extant ancient manuscripts of this version include Codex Vaticanus (B; $\mathfrak{G}$^{B}; 4th century), Codex Sinaiticus (S; BHK: $\mathfrak{G}$^{S}; 4th century), and Codex Alexandrinus (A; $\mathfrak{G}$^{A}; 5th century).

== Analysis ==
The structure of the book is as follows:

- The Prologue (chapters 1–2)
- The Dialogue (chapters 3–31)
- The Verdicts (32:1–42:6)
- The Epilogue (42:7–17)

Within the structure, chapter 15 is grouped into the Dialogue section with the following outline:

- Job's Self-Curse and Self-Lament (3:1–26)
- Round One (4:1–14:22)
- Round Two (15:1–21:34)
  - Eliphaz (15:1–35)
    - A Rebuke of Job (15:1–6)
    - How God Views and Treats Humans (15:7–16)
    - The Fate of the Wicked (15:17–35)
  - Job (16:1–17:16)
  - Bildad (18:1–21)
  - Job (19:1–29)
  - Zophar (20:1–29)
  - Job (21:1–34)
- Round Three (22:1–27:23)
- Interlude – A Poem on Wisdom (28:1–28)
- Job's Summing Up (29:1–31:40)

The Dialogue section is composed in the format of poetry with distinctive syntax and grammar.

Chapter 15 consists of three parts:

- Eliphaz rebukes Job (verses 1–6)
- Eliphaz outlines his dispute with Job (verses 7–16)
- Eliphaz describes the fate of the wicked (verses 1–6)

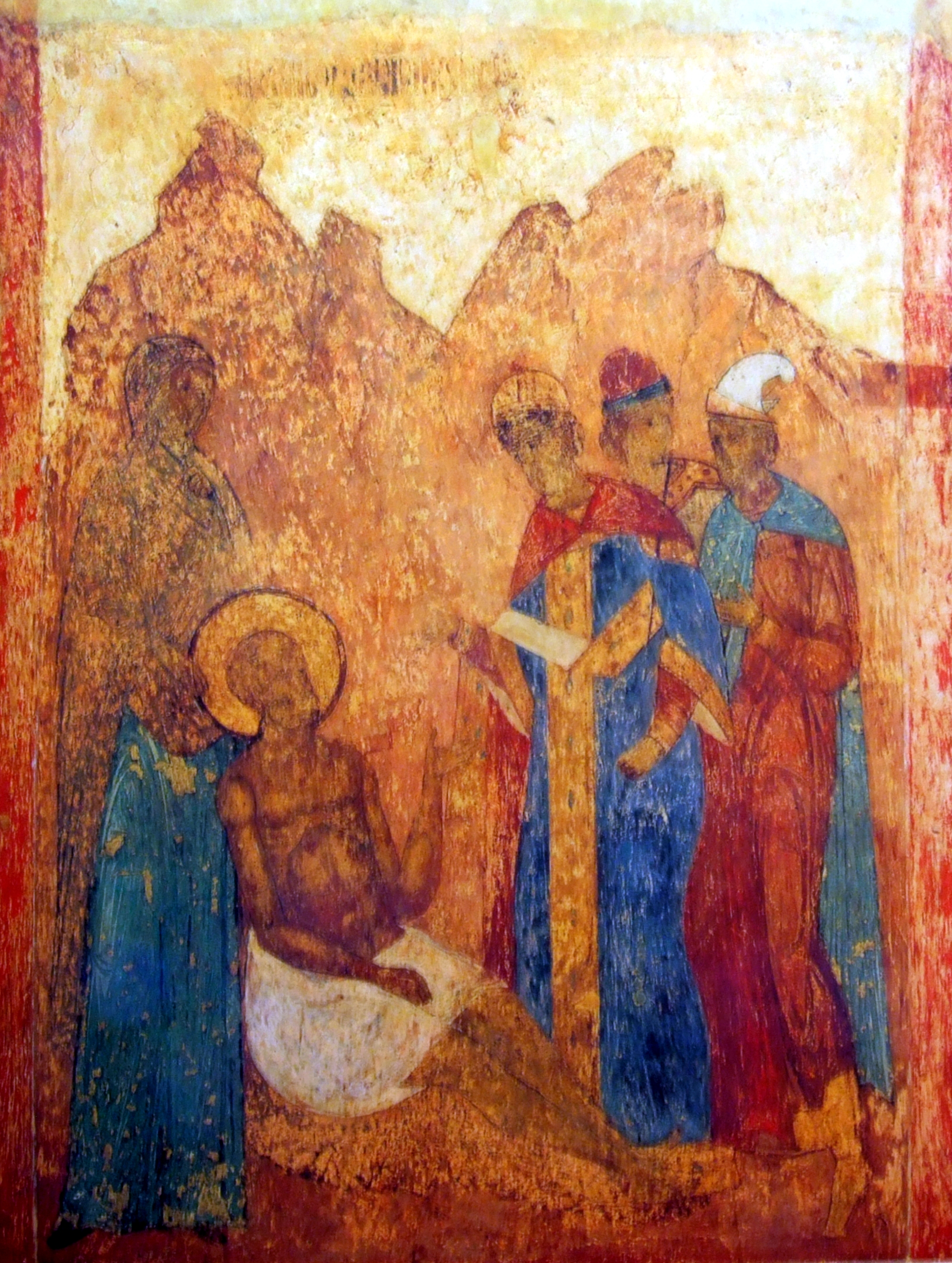
"Job and his friends", painted between 1547 and 1551.

== Eliphaz challenges Job (15:1–16) ==
The first part of this section contains Eliphaz's rebuke to Job for the choices Job made and the emptiness of the words of Job, who thinks of himself as a wise man (verses 1–6). Eliphaz concerns that Job undermines the proper attitude of respecting God (Eliphaz is the only one of Job's three friends who refers to the "fear of God"). Eliphaz challenges each of Job's possible justifications and rejects each in turn:

1. Job may have 'some primacy in creation' (verse 7; cf. Proverbs 8:22–31), that is, he was present at creation; this is an impossible scenario.
2. Job may have access to God's mind and purposes, that is, he was present in the heavenly council (verse 8a); this is impossible for a human being.
3. Job might think he has information that no one else has (two questions in verse 8b and 9); this is the real issue for Eliphaz (verse 10) who then appeals to the words of the sages (also in verse 18), similar to Bildad's appeal to tradition (Job 8:8–10).

Eliphaz suggests that Job should be satisfied with his current condition, rather than searching for further answers, because no human can come to God with a clean slate (verse 11–13, 16).

=== Verse 2 ===
[Eliphaz said:] "Should a wise man answer with windy knowledge,

and fill his belly with the east wind?"

- "Windy knowledge": translated from the Hebrew phrase דַעַת־רוּחַ, daʿat ruakh, which means "knowledge without any content" or "vain knowledge".
- "East wind”: translated from the Hebrew phrase קָדִים, qadim, a parallel to "spirit/wind" (cf. Hosea 12:1–2), in this case it is 'maleficent', but here refers to 'hot air', the 'scorching and destructive wind' that 'blows off the Arabian dessert'.

== Eliphaz describes the fate of the wicked (15:17–35) ==
The lengthy description exploring the fate of the wicked in this section serves as a warning to Job. Each of the three friends states their particular description with different functions:

- Eliphaz implies that this may apply to Job at this moment
- Bildad warns this is what Job may become (chapter 18)
- Zophar suggest this is what Job must avoid (chapter 20).

Eliphaz claims that Job would have known the teaching because it is in the tradition of the sages (verses 18–19). In essence, Eliphaz describes the negative aspect of the doctrine of retribution, that is, 'God will punish those who do evil' (verses 20–24 and 27–35). Eliphaz's final verdict uses the imagery of birth that the conceived wickedness and deceit will grow up to be evil.

=== Verse 35 ===
[Eliphaz said:] "They conceive trouble and give birth to evil,

and their womb prepares deceit."

The last statement that 'Job's belly prepares deception' forms an 'inclusio' which frames Eliphaz's speech with the statement at the start that 'Job's belly was filled with the wind'.

== See also ==
- Divine retribution
- Righteousness
- Sin
- Suffering
- Vanity
- Wisdom
- Related Bible parts: Job 4, Job 5, Job 8

== Sources ==
- Alter, Robert (2010). The Wisdom Books: Job, Proverbs, and Ecclesiastes: A Translation with Commentary. W.W. Norton & Co. ISBN 978-0393080735.
- Coogan, Michael David (2007). Coogan, Michael David; Brettler, Marc Zvi; Newsom, Carol Ann; Perkins, Pheme (eds.). The New Oxford Annotated Bible with the Apocryphal/Deuterocanonical Books: New Revised Standard Version, Issue 48 (Augmented 3rd ed.). Oxford University Press. ISBN 9780195288810.
- Crenshaw, James L. (2007). "17. Job". In Barton, John; Muddiman, John (eds.). The Oxford Bible Commentary (first (paperback) ed.). Oxford University Press. pp. 331–355. ISBN 978-0199277186.
- Estes, Daniel J. (2013). Walton, John H.; Strauss, Mark L. (eds.). Job. Teach the Text Commentary Series. United States: Baker Publishing Group. ISBN 9781441242778.
- Farmer, Kathleen A. (1998). "The Wisdom Books". In McKenzie, Steven L.; Graham, Matt Patrick (eds.). The Hebrew Bible Today: An Introduction to Critical Issues. Westminster John Knox Press. ISBN 978-0-66425652-4.
- Halley, Henry H. (1965). Halley's Bible Handbook: an abbreviated Bible commentary (24th (revised) ed.). Zondervan Publishing House. ISBN 0-310-25720-4.
- Kugler, Robert; Hartin, Patrick J. (2009). An Introduction to the Bible. Eerdmans. ISBN 978-0-8028-4636-5.
- Walton, John H. (2012). Job. United States: Zondervan. ISBN 9780310492009.
- Wilson, Lindsay (2015). Job. United States: Wm. B. Eerdmans Publishing Company. ISBN 9781467443289.
- Würthwein, Ernst (1995). The Text of the Old Testament. Translated by Rhodes, Erroll F. Grand Rapids, MI: Wm. B. Eerdmans. ISBN 0-8028-0788-7.
