= Job 37 =

37th chapter of the Book of Job

- ← chapter 36 chapter 38 →
- The whole Book of Job in the Leningrad Codex (1008 C.E.) from an old facsimile edition.
- Book: Book of Job
- Hebrew Bible part: Ketuvim
- Order in the Hebrew part: 3
- Category: Sifrei Emet
- Christian Bible part: Old Testament
- Order in the Christian part: 18

Job 37 is the 37th chapter of the Book of Job in the Hebrew Bible or the Old Testament of the Christian Bible. The book is anonymous; most scholars believe it was written around 6th century BCE. This chapter records the speech of Elihu, which belongs to the "Verdicts" section of the book, comprising Job 32:1–42:6.

== Text ==
The original text is written in Hebrew language. This chapter is divided into 24 verses.

=== Textual witnesses ===
Some early manuscripts containing the text of this chapter in Hebrew are of the Masoretic Text, which includes the Aleppo Codex (10th century), and Codex Leningradensis (1008). Fragments containing parts of this chapter in Hebrew were found among the Dead Sea Scrolls including 4Q99 (4QJob^{a}; 175–60 BCE) with extant verses 1–5, 14–15.

There is also a translation into Koine Greek known as the Septuagint, made in the last few centuries BC; some extant ancient manuscripts of this version include Codex Vaticanus (B; $\mathfrak{G}$^{B}; 4th century), Codex Sinaiticus (S; BHK: $\mathfrak{G}$^{S}; 4th century), and Codex Alexandrinus (A; $\mathfrak{G}$^{A}; 5th century).

== Analysis ==
The structure of the book is as follows:

- The Prologue (chapters 1–2)
- The Dialogue (chapters 3–31)
- The Verdicts (32:1–42:6)
- The Epilogue (42:7–17)

Within the structure, chapter 37 is grouped into the Verdict section with the following outline:

- Elihu's Verdict (32:1–37:24)
  - Prose Introduction of Elihu (32:1–5)
  - Elihu's Apology (32:6–22)
  - A Transition from Apology to Argument (33:1–7)
  - Elihu's First Speech (33:8–33)
  - Elihu's Second Speech (34:1–37)
  - Elihu's Third Speech (35:1–16)
  - Elihu's Fourth Speech (36:1–37:24)
    - A Summons to Job (36:1–4)
    - Elihu's Verdict (36:5–7)
    - The Substantiation of the Verdict (36:8–15)
    - Application to Job (36:16–21)
    - Hymn of Praise (36:22–37:24)
      - God's Powerful Works Deserve Praise (36:22–25)
      - God's Control of Rain and Storms (36:26–29)
      - God's Use of Lightning (36:30–33)
      - God's Purposes through Thunder and Lightning (37:1–5)
      - God's Activity in the Rest of the Natural World (37:6–13)
      - Challenge to Understand God's Great Works (37:14–20)
      - Fear the Coming of God (37:21–24)
- God's Appearance (Yahweh Speeches) and Job's Responses (38:1–42:6)
  - God's First Speech (38:1–40:2)
  - Job's First Reply – An Insufficient Response (40:3–5)
  - God's Second Speech (40:6–41:34)
  - Job's Second Reply (42:1–6)

The section containing Elihu's speeches serves as a bridge between the Dialogue (chapters 3–31) and the speeches of YHWH (chapters 38–41). There is an introduction in the prose form (Job 32:1–5), describing Elihu's identity and circumstances that cause him to speak (starting in Job 32:6). The whole speech section can be formally divided into four monologues, each starting with a similar formula (Job 32:6; 34:1; 35:1; 36:1). Elihu's first monologue is preceded by an apologia (justification) for speaking (Job 32:6–22) and a transitionary part which introduces Elihu's main arguments (Job 33:1–7) before the speech formally commences (Job 33:8–33).

In the first three speeches Elihu cites and then disputes specific Job's charges in the preceding dialogue:

Job's charges	Elihu's response
Job 33:8–11	Job 33:12–30
Job 34:5–9	Job 34:10–33
Job 35:2–3	Job 35:4–13

The fourth (and final) speech of Elihu comprises chapters 36–37, in which Elihu stops refuting Job's charges, but states his conclusions and verdict:

1. A summon to Job (Job 36:1–21)
2. A hymn of praise to God as creator (Job 36:22–37:13)
3. A concluding address to Job (Job 37:14–24)

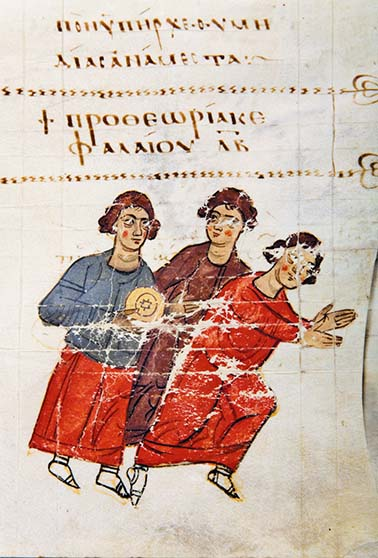
"God speaks to Job", from: Book of Job in Illuminated Byzantine Manuscripts with Cyclic Illustration (AD 900). Monastery of St.John the Theologian, Patmos.

== Elihu asks Job's attention (37:1–13) ==
This section contains the continuation of Elihu's hymn of praise to God as Creator (Job 36:22–25; 26–29, 30–33; 37:1–5, 6–13). The storm imagery to animately describe God's work in nature anticipates God's appearance in the whirlwind (Job 38).

=== Verse 5 ===
[Elihu said:] "God thunders marvelously with His voice;

He does great things that we cannot comprehend."

- "Marvelously": translated from the Niphal participle form of the Hebrew verb פָּלָא, palaʾ ("to be wonderful; to be extraordinary").

This affirms that God is perfect in knowledge (cf. Job 36:4; 37:16).

== Elihu points to the corrective benefit of suffering (37:14–24) ==
In the last part of his last speech, Elihu calls Job to perceive God's great works (verses 14–20) and closing with a more general summary of God's greatness (verses 21–24). The introduction of the coming of God (verses 21–22) anticipates the appearance of God (the image of light following the storm) and the correlation between God's power and justice (verse 23) prepares for God's speeches.

=== Verse 16 ===
[Elihu said:] "Do you know the balancings of the clouds,

the wondrous works of him who is perfect in knowledge,"

- "Balancings": or "hoverings", translated from the Hebrew word מִפְלְשֵׂי, mip̄-lə-śê, probably refers to “floating” or “suspension” (cf. NIV: "how the clouds hang poised").

== See also ==
- Divine judgment
- Divine providence
- Job
- Omnipotence
- God Shaddai (Almighty)
- Related Bible parts: Job 34, Job 35, Job 36

== Sources ==
- Alter, Robert (2010). The Wisdom Books: Job, Proverbs, and Ecclesiastes: A Translation with Commentary. W.W. Norton & Co. ISBN 978-0393080735.
- Coogan, Michael David (2007). Coogan, Michael David; Brettler, Marc Zvi; Newsom, Carol Ann; Perkins, Pheme (eds.). The New Oxford Annotated Bible with the Apocryphal/Deuterocanonical Books: New Revised Standard Version, Issue 48 (Augmented 3rd ed.). Oxford University Press. ISBN 9780195288810.
- Crenshaw, James L. (2007). "17. Job". In Barton, John; Muddiman, John (eds.). The Oxford Bible Commentary (first (paperback) ed.). Oxford University Press. pp. 331–355. ISBN 978-0199277186.
- Estes, Daniel J. (2013). Walton, John H.; Strauss, Mark L. (eds.). Job. Teach the Text Commentary Series. United States: Baker Publishing Group. ISBN 9781441242778.
- Farmer, Kathleen A. (1998). "The Wisdom Books". In McKenzie, Steven L.; Graham, Matt Patrick (eds.). The Hebrew Bible Today: An Introduction to Critical Issues. Westminster John Knox Press. ISBN 978-0-66425652-4.
- Fitzmyer, Joseph A. (2008). A Guide to the Dead Sea Scrolls and Related Literature. Grand Rapids, MI: William B. Eerdmans Publishing Company. ISBN 9780802862419.
- Halley, Henry H. (1965). Halley's Bible Handbook: an abbreviated Bible commentary (24th (revised) ed.). Zondervan Publishing House. ISBN 0-310-25720-4.
- Kugler, Robert; Hartin, Patrick J. (2009). An Introduction to the Bible. Eerdmans. ISBN 978-0-8028-4636-5.
- Ulrich, Eugene, ed. (2010). The Biblical Qumran Scrolls: Transcriptions and Textual Variants. Brill.
- Walton, John H. (2012). Job. United States: Zondervan. ISBN 9780310492009.
- Wilson, Lindsay (2015). Job. United States: Wm. B. Eerdmans Publishing Company. ISBN 9781467443289.
- Würthwein, Ernst (1995). The Text of the Old Testament. Translated by Rhodes, Erroll F. Grand Rapids, MI: Wm. B. Eerdmans. ISBN 0-8028-0788-7.
