= Job 34 =

34th chapter of the Book of Job

- ← chapter 33 chapter 35 →
- The whole Book of Job in the Leningrad Codex (1008 C.E.) from an old facsimile edition.
- Book: Book of Job
- Hebrew Bible part: Ketuvim
- Order in the Hebrew part: 3
- Category: Sifrei Emet
- Christian Bible part: Old Testament
- Order in the Christian part: 18

Job 34 is the 34th chapter of the Book of Job in the Hebrew Bible or the Old Testament of the Christian Bible. The book is anonymous; most scholars believe it was written around 6th century BCE. This chapter records the speech of Elihu, which belongs to the "Verdicts" section of the book, comprising Job 32:1–42:6.

== Text ==
The original text is written in Hebrew language. This chapter is divided into 37 verses.

=== Textual witnesses ===
Some early manuscripts containing the text of this chapter in Hebrew are of the Masoretic Text, which includes the Aleppo Codex (10th century), and Codex Leningradensis (1008).

There is also a translation into Koine Greek known as the Septuagint, made in the last few centuries BCE; some extant ancient manuscripts of this version include Codex Vaticanus (B; $\mathfrak{G}$^{B}; 4th century), Codex Sinaiticus (S; BHK: $\mathfrak{G}$^{S}; 4th century), and Codex Alexandrinus (A; $\mathfrak{G}$^{A}; 5th century).

== Analysis ==
The structure of the book is as follows:

- The Prologue (chapters 1–2)
- The Dialogue (chapters 3–31)
- The Verdicts (32:1–42:6)
- The Epilogue (42:7–17)

Within the structure, chapter 34 is grouped into the Verdict section with the following outline:

- Elihu's Verdict (32:1–37:24)
  - Prose Introduction of Elihu (32:1–5)
  - Elihu's Apology (32:6–22)
  - A Transition from Apology to Argument (33:1–7)
  - Elihu's First Speech (33:8–33)
  - Elihu's Second Speech (34:1–37)
    - Call to the Wise Men to Listen (34:1–4)
    - Citation of Job's Charges (34:5–9)
    - God Will Not Do Wrong (34:10–12)
    - God Is in Charge of the Earth (34:13–15)
    - God's Justice (34:16–20)
    - God's Knowledge Grounds His Judgment (34:21–30)
    - Appealing for a Response (34:31–33)
    - Urging the Wise to Agree with Him (34:34–37)
  - Elihu's Third Speech (35:1–16)
  - Elihu's Fourth Speech (36:1–37:24)
- God's Appearance (Yahweh Speeches) and Job's Responses (38:1–42:6)
  - God's First Speech (38:1–40:2)
  - Job's First Reply – An Insufficient Response (40:3–5)
  - God's Second Speech (40:6–41:34)
  - Job's Second Reply (42:1–6)

The section containing Elihu's speeches serves as a bridge between the Dialogue (chapters 3–31) and the speeches of YHWH (chapters 38–41). There is an introduction in the prose form (Job 32:1–5), describing Elihu's identity and circumstances that cause him to speak (starting in Job 32:6). The whole speech section can be formally divided into four monologues, each starting with a similar formula (Job 32:6; 34:1; 35:1; 36:1). Elihu's first monologue is preceded by an apologia (justification) for speaking (Job 32:6–22) and a transitionary part which introduces Elihu's main arguments (Job 33:1–7) before the speech formally commences (Job 33:8–33).

In the first three speeches Elihu cites and then disputes specific Job's charges in the preceding dialogue:

Job's charges	Elihu's response
Job 33:8–11	Job 33:12–30
Job 34:5–9	Job 34:10–33
Job 35:2–3	Job 35:4–13

The second speech of Elihu in chapter 34 opens with a summon to the sages (presumably gathered around Job and his friends) to confirm his view (verses 2–4; cf. Job 34:10, 34) before citing Job's charges (Job 34:5–9) and providing correction to Job's view (34:10–33) and then again inviting the sages to consider the correction. The focus of the speech is God's justice.

In chapters 36–37 Elihu stops refuting Job's charges, but states his conclusions and verdict:

1. A summon to Job (Job 36:1–21)
2. A hymn of praise to God as creator (Job 36:22–37:13)
3. A concluding address to Job (Job 37:14–24)

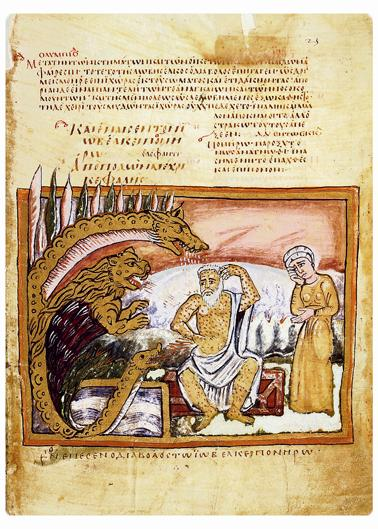
Book of Job in Illuminated Byzantine Manuscripts with Cyclic Illustration (AD 900). Biblioteca Apostolica Vaticana. Rome

== Elihu calls the wise men to listen to his speech (34:1–4) ==
The section starts with Elihu calling on the sages to examine Job's intention for litigation (verse 3 quoting Job 12:11). This indicates that Elihu has listened well and now skillfully uses Job's own word back on him.

=== Verse 3 ===
[Elihu said:] "For the ear tests words,

as the mouth tastes food."

- Citing Job 12:11
- "Tests": or "examines; tries; discerns".
- "Mouth": or "palate"; as the Hebrew term can refer to "the tongue or to the mouth in general".

== Elihu's second speech (34:5–37) ==
Elihu quotes Job's words from different parts of speeches (verse 5a citing Job 9:21; 13:18; 27:2–6; verse 5b citing Job 27:22; also 14:3; 19:7; verse 9 citing Job 9:22–24 and 21:5–13) which claim that the innocent Job has been wrongly denied justice by God. Then, Elihu comprehensively refutes Job with the strong insistence that God is fundamentally just and committed to justice. God the creator has all the right to actively rule over his creation, so can never be charged with acting unjustly, as God's sovereign power extends to life and death, and God does not need further information before acting justly (verses 24–25). Closing his speech, Elihu urges the gathering wise men to adopt his analysis of Job (verses 34–37).

=== Verse 12 ===
[Elihu said:] "IYea, surely God will not do wickedly, neither will the Almighty pervert judgment."

This is one step further than verse 10 to emphasize that God cannot do what is wrong or wicked.

== See also ==
- Divine judgment
- Evil
- Job
- Omniscience
- Righteousness
- God Shaddai (Almighty)
- Related Bible parts: Job 9, Job 13, Job 14, Job 19, Job 21, Job 27

== Sources ==
- Alter, Robert (2010). The Wisdom Books: Job, Proverbs, and Ecclesiastes: A Translation with Commentary. W.W. Norton & Co. ISBN 978-0393080735.
- Coogan, Michael David (2007). Coogan, Michael David; Brettler, Marc Zvi; Newsom, Carol Ann; Perkins, Pheme (eds.). The New Oxford Annotated Bible with the Apocryphal/Deuterocanonical Books: New Revised Standard Version, Issue 48 (Augmented 3rd ed.). Oxford University Press. ISBN 9780195288810.
- Crenshaw, James L. (2007). "17. Job". In Barton, John; Muddiman, John (eds.). The Oxford Bible Commentary (first (paperback) ed.). Oxford University Press. pp. 331–355. ISBN 978-0199277186.
- Estes, Daniel J. (2013). Walton, John H.; Strauss, Mark L. (eds.). Job. Teach the Text Commentary Series. United States: Baker Publishing Group. ISBN 9781441242778.
- Farmer, Kathleen A. (1998). "The Wisdom Books". In McKenzie, Steven L.; Graham, Matt Patrick (eds.). The Hebrew Bible Today: An Introduction to Critical Issues. Westminster John Knox Press. ISBN 978-0-66425652-4.
- Halley, Henry H. (1965). Halley's Bible Handbook: an abbreviated Bible commentary (24th (revised) ed.). Zondervan Publishing House. ISBN 0-310-25720-4.
- Kugler, Robert; Hartin, Patrick J. (2009). An Introduction to the Bible. Eerdmans. ISBN 978-0-8028-4636-5.
- Walton, John H. (2012). Job. United States: Zondervan. ISBN 9780310492009.
- Wilson, Lindsay (2015). Job. United States: Wm. B. Eerdmans Publishing Company. ISBN 9781467443289.
- Würthwein, Ernst (1995). The Text of the Old Testament. Translated by Rhodes, Erroll F. Grand Rapids, MI: Wm. B. Eerdmans. ISBN 0-8028-0788-7.
