= Job 36 =

36th chapter of the Book of Job

- ← chapter 35 chapter 37 →
- The whole Book of Job in the Leningrad Codex (1008 C.E.) from an old facsimile edition.
- Book: Book of Job
- Hebrew Bible part: Ketuvim
- Order in the Hebrew part: 3
- Category: Sifrei Emet
- Christian Bible part: Old Testament
- Order in the Christian part: 18

Job 36 is the 36th chapter of the Book of Job in the Hebrew Bible or the Old Testament of the Christian Bible. The book is anonymous; most scholars believe it was written around 6th century BCE. This chapter records the speech of Elihu, which belongs to the "Verdicts" section of the book, comprising Job 32:1–42:6.

== Text ==
The original text is written in Hebrew language. This chapter is divided into 33 verses.

=== Textual witnesses ===
Some early manuscripts containing the text of this chapter in Hebrew are of the Masoretic Text, which includes the Aleppo Codex (10th century), and Codex Leningradensis (1008). Fragments containing parts of this chapter in Hebrew were found among the Dead Sea Scrolls including 4Q99 (4QJob^{a}; 175–60 BCE) with extant verses 7–11, 13–27, 32–33.

There is also a translation into Koine Greek known as the Septuagint, made in the last few centuries BC; some extant ancient manuscripts of this version include Codex Vaticanus (B; $\mathfrak{G}$^{B}; 4th century), Codex Sinaiticus (S; BHK: $\mathfrak{G}$^{S}; 4th century), and Codex Alexandrinus (A; $\mathfrak{G}$^{A}; 5th century).

== Analysis ==
The structure of the book is as follows:

- The Prologue (chapters 1–2)
- The Dialogue (chapters 3–31)
- The Verdicts (32:1–42:6)
- The Epilogue (42:7–17)

Within the structure, chapter 36 is grouped into the Verdict section with the following outline:

- Elihu's Verdict (32:1–37:24)
  - Prose Introduction of Elihu (32:1–5)
  - Elihu's Apology (32:6–22)
  - A Transition from Apology to Argument (33:1–7)
  - Elihu's First Speech (33:8–33)
  - Elihu's Second Speech (34:1–37)
  - Elihu's Third Speech (35:1–16)
  - Elihu's Fourth Speech (36:1–37:24)
    - A Summons to Job (36:1–4)
    - Elihu's Verdict (36:5–7)
    - The Substantiation of the Verdict (36:8–15)
    - Application to Job (36:16–21)
    - Hymn of Praise (36:22–37:24)
      - God's Powerful Works Deserve Praise (36:22–25)
      - God's Control of Rain and Storms (36:26–29)
      - God's Use of Lightning (36:30–33)
      - God's Purposes through Thunder and Lightning (37:1–5)
      - God's Activity in the Rest of the Natural World (37:6–13)
      - Challenge to Understand God's Great Works (37:14–20)
      - Fear the Coming of God (37:21–24)
- God's Appearance (Yahweh Speeches) and Job's Responses (38:1–42:6)
  - God's First Speech (38:1–40:2)
  - Job's First Reply – An Insufficient Response (40:3–5)
  - God's Second Speech (40:6–41:34)
  - Job's Second Reply (42:1–6)

The section containing Elihu's speeches serves as a bridge between the Dialogue (chapters 3–31) and the speeches of YHWH (chapters 38–41). There is an introduction in the prose form (Job 32:1–5), describing Elihu's identity and circumstances that cause him to speak (starting in Job 32:6). The whole speech section can be formally divided into four monologues, each starting with a similar formula (Job 32:6; 34:1; 35:1; 36:1). Elihu's first monologue is preceded by an apologia (justification) for speaking (Job 32:6–22) and a transitionary part which introduces Elihu's main arguments (Job 33:1–7) before the speech formally commences (Job 33:8–33).

In the first three speeches Elihu cites and then disputes specific Job's charges in the preceding dialogue:

Job's charges	Elihu's response
Job 33:8–11	Job 33:12–30
Job 34:5–9	Job 34:10–33
Job 35:2–3	Job 35:4–13

The fourth (and final) speech of Elihu comprises chapters 36–37, in which Elihu stops refuting Job's charges, but states his conclusions and verdict:

1. A summon to Job (Job 36:1–21)
2. A hymn of praise to God as creator (Job 36:22–37:13)
3. A concluding address to Job (Job 37:14–24)

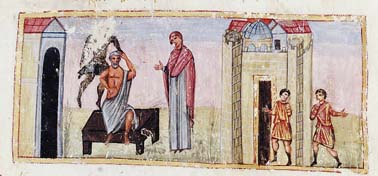
Book of Job in Illuminated Byzantine Manuscripts with Cyclic Illustration (AD 1100). Saint Catherine's Monastery. Mount Sinai.

== Elihu asks Job's attention (36:1–4) ==
After speaking without interruption for a long time, Elihu likely senses that Job (and his friends) may be impatient for him to finish, so he calls for Job's attention. Elihu claims that what he is saying is right because he voices God's perfect knowledge (verse 4; cf. Job 37:16: Elihu affirms that God is perfect in knowledge).

=== Verse 4 ===
[Elihu said:] "For truly my words will not be false;

He who is perfect in knowledge is with you."

- "Perfect": translated from the Hebrew word תְּמִים, temim; the same word used of Job in Job 2:3.

== Elihu points to the corrective benefit of suffering (36:5–33) ==
Elihu's last speech is more compassionate and constructive than his previous three discourses. He focuses on the consequences of suffering rather than its cause, that suffering is God's discipline by which a person can be built up and be better. In the second part of this speech, Elihu voices a hymn of praise to God as Creator (Job 36:22–25; 26–29, 30–33; 37:1–5, 6–13). His words actually prepare for the divine appearance in chapter 38.

=== Verse 31 ===
[Elihu said:] "For by these He judges the people;

He gives food in abundance."

Elihu draws a parallel between God's arrangements of natural world with God's government of human world; in both worlds, God is 'transcendent and in control'.

== See also ==
- Divine judgment
- Job
- Omnipotence
- God Shaddai (Almighty)
- Sin
- Related Bible parts: Job 7, Job 9, Job 21

== Sources ==
- Alter, Robert (2010). The Wisdom Books: Job, Proverbs, and Ecclesiastes: A Translation with Commentary. W.W. Norton & Co. ISBN 978-0393080735.
- Coogan, Michael David (2007). Coogan, Michael David; Brettler, Marc Zvi; Newsom, Carol Ann; Perkins, Pheme (eds.). The New Oxford Annotated Bible with the Apocryphal/Deuterocanonical Books: New Revised Standard Version, Issue 48 (Augmented 3rd ed.). Oxford University Press. ISBN 9780195288810.
- Crenshaw, James L. (2007). "17. Job". In Barton, John; Muddiman, John (eds.). The Oxford Bible Commentary (first (paperback) ed.). Oxford University Press. pp. 331–355. ISBN 978-0199277186.
- Estes, Daniel J. (2013). Walton, John H.; Strauss, Mark L. (eds.). Job. Teach the Text Commentary Series. United States: Baker Publishing Group. ISBN 9781441242778.
- Farmer, Kathleen A. (1998). "The Wisdom Books". In McKenzie, Steven L.; Graham, Matt Patrick (eds.). The Hebrew Bible Today: An Introduction to Critical Issues. Westminster John Knox Press. ISBN 978-0-66425652-4.
- Fitzmyer, Joseph A. (2008). A Guide to the Dead Sea Scrolls and Related Literature. Grand Rapids, MI: William B. Eerdmans Publishing Company. ISBN 9780802862419.
- Halley, Henry H. (1965). Halley's Bible Handbook: an abbreviated Bible commentary (24th (revised) ed.). Zondervan Publishing House. ISBN 0-310-25720-4.
- Kugler, Robert; Hartin, Patrick J. (2009). An Introduction to the Bible. Eerdmans. ISBN 978-0-8028-4636-5.
- Ulrich, Eugene, ed. (2010). The Biblical Qumran Scrolls: Transcriptions and Textual Variants. Brill.
- Walton, John H. (2012). Job. United States: Zondervan. ISBN 9780310492009.
- Wilson, Lindsay (2015). Job. United States: Wm. B. Eerdmans Publishing Company. ISBN 9781467443289.
- Würthwein, Ernst (1995). The Text of the Old Testament. Translated by Rhodes, Erroll F. Grand Rapids, MI: Wm. B. Eerdmans. ISBN 0-8028-0788-7.
