= Job 33 =

33rd chapter of the Book of Job

- ← chapter 32 chapter 34 →
- The whole Book of Job in the Leningrad Codex (1008 C.E.) from an old facsimile edition.
- Book: Book of Job
- Hebrew Bible part: Ketuvim
- Order in the Hebrew part: 3
- Category: Sifrei Emet
- Christian Bible part: Old Testament
- Order in the Christian part: 18

Job 33 is the 33rd chapter of the Book of Job in the Hebrew Bible or the Old Testament of the Christian Bible. The book is anonymous; most scholars believe it was written around 6th century BCE. This chapter records the speech of Elihu, which belongs to the "Verdicts" section of the book, comprising Job 32:1–42:6.

== Text ==
The original text is written in Hebrew language. This chapter is divided into 33 verses.

=== Textual witnesses ===
Some early manuscripts containing the text of this chapter in Hebrew are of the Masoretic Text, which includes the Aleppo Codex (10th century), and Codex Leningradensis (1008). Fragments containing parts of this chapter in Hebrew were found among the Dead Sea Scrolls including 2Q15 (2QJob; 30 BCE–30 CE) with extant verses 28–30 and 4Q99 (4QJob^{a}; 175–60 BCE) with extant verses 10–11, 24–30.

There is also a translation into Koine Greek known as the Septuagint, made in the last few centuries BC; some extant ancient manuscripts of this version include Codex Vaticanus (B; $\mathfrak{G}$^{B}; 4th century), Codex Sinaiticus (S; BHK: $\mathfrak{G}$^{S}; 4th century), and Codex Alexandrinus (A; $\mathfrak{G}$^{A}; 5th century).

== Analysis ==
The structure of the book is as follows:

- The Prologue (chapters 1–2)
- The Dialogue (chapters 3–31)
- The Verdicts (32:1–42:6)
- The Epilogue (42:7–17)

Within the structure, chapter 33 is grouped into the Verdict section with the following outline:

- Elihu's Verdict (32:1–37:24)
  - Prose Introduction of Elihu (32:1–5)
  - Elihu's Apology (32:6–22)
  - A Transition from Apology to Argument (33:1–7)
  - Elihu's First Speech (33:8–33)
    - Citation of Job's Charges (33:8–11)
    - Job Is in the Wrong (33:12–14)
    - God Speaks through Dreams (33:15–18)
    - God Speaks through Suffering (33:19–22)
    - An Angelic Mediator (33:23–30)
    - Appealing for a Response (33:31–33)
  - Elihu's Second Speech (34:1–37)
  - Elihu's Third Speech (35:1–16)
  - Elihu's Fourth Speech (36:1–37:24)
- God's Appearance (Yahweh Speeches) and Job's Responses (38:1–42:6)
  - God's First Speech (38:1–40:2)
  - Job's First Reply – An Insufficient Response (40:3–5)
  - God's Second Speech (40:6–41:34)
  - Job's Second Reply (42:1–6)

The section containing Elihu's speeches serves as a bridge between the Dialogue (chapters 3–31) and the speeches of YHWH (chapters 38–41). There is an introduction in the prose form (Job 32:1–5), describing Elihu's identity and circumstances that cause him to speak (starting in Job 32:6). The whole speech section can be formally divided into four monologues, each starting with a similar formula (Job 32:6; 34:1; 35:1; 36:1). Elihu's first monologue is preceded by an apologia (justification) for speaking (Job 32:6–22) and a transitionary part which introduces Elihu's main arguments (Job 33:1–7) before the speech formally commences (Job 33:8–33).

In the first three speeches Elihu cites and then disputes specific Job's charges in the preceding dialogue:

Job's charges	Elihu's response
Job 33:8–11	Job 33:12–30
Job 34:5–9	Job 34:10–33
Job 35:2–3	Job 35:4–13

The first speech in chapter 33 opens with a citation of Job's charges (Job 33:8–11), followed by a rejection to Job's argument about God's silence (Job 33:12–13), that, according to Elihu, God speaks in a variety of ways (Job 33:14): through dreams (Job 33:15–18), through suffering (Job 33:19–22) and through messengers (angels; Job 33:23–28), so now Elihu challenges Job to listen to him (Job 33:29–33).

In chapters 36–37 Elihu stops refuting Job's charges, but states his conclusions and verdict:

1. A summon to Job (Job 36:1–21)
2. A hymn of praise to God as creator (Job 36:22–37:13)
3. A concluding address to Job (Job 37:14–24)

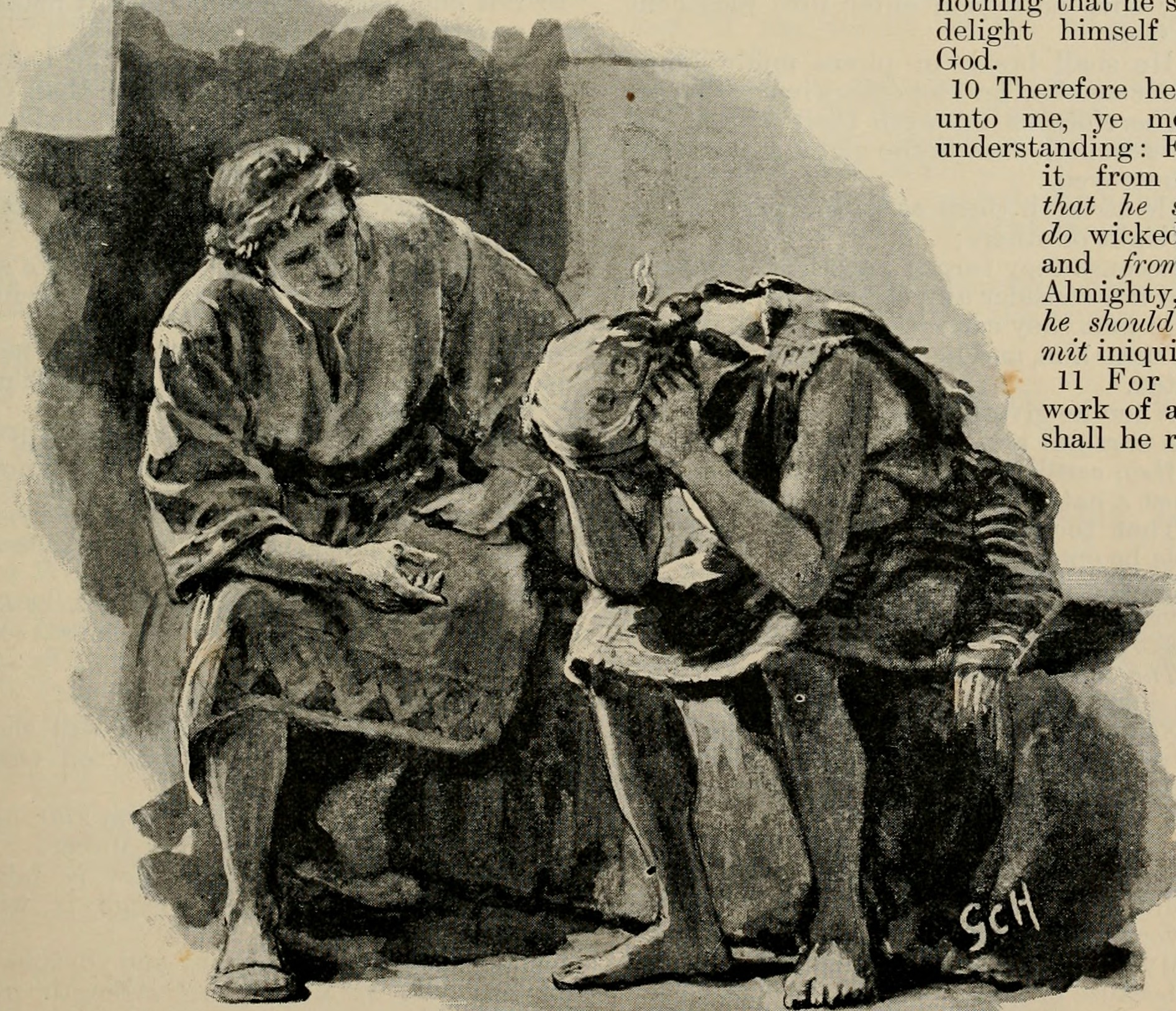
Elihu talks to Job, from: The art Bible, comprising the Old and new Testaments: with numerous illustrations (1896) London: G. Newnes.

== Preamble to Elihu's speech (33:1–7) ==
The section starts with Elihu addressing Job by name (Job's friends never mentioned Job's name), stating that as a fellow human being, he can speak to Job as an equal (verse 4), because they both are created by their maker (verse 6b; cf. Isaiah 45:9). Elihu claims to be speaking from "uprightness of heart" and "pure, sincere lips" (verse 3; cf. "the breath of the Almighty" in verse 4), so his words will lead to better understanding, as he challenges but as the same time provides reassurances to Job (verses 6–7).

=== Verse 4 ===
[Elihu said:] "The Spirit of God has made me,

and the breath of the Almighty has given me life."

- "The Spirit of God": translated from the Hebrew phrase רֽוּחַ־אֵ֥ל, rūakh-’êl", along with the phrase "the breath of the Almighty" (נִשְׁמַ֖ת שַׁדַּ֣י, nish-maṯ shad-day",) echo Job 32:8 that Elihu is possessed of wisdom, and here focuses on the functional aspect of the creation that gives life.
- "Has given me life": translated from the Hebrew verb תְּחַיֵּנִי, tekhayyênî, using the Piel imperfect of the verb "to live", so it can mean "gives me life" or "quickens me, enlivens me".

== Elihu's first speech (33:8–33) ==
Elihu quotes what he heard of Job's charges (verses 8–11) in which Job maintains his innocence (cited 4 times in verse 9) while Job feels that God has wronged him (cited 4 times in verses 10–11; cf. Job 10:6–7; 13:23 in Job 33:10a; Job 13:24b in Job 33:10b; Job 13:27 in Job 33:11). Elihu focuses his response only on the words spoken among Job and his friends, not on Job's prior actions, but on how to speak rightly about God, so Elihu is basically delivering a verdict on the debate. In addressing Job's legal approach, Elihu rightly understands that Job's pursuit of litigation was primarily to get God to answer Job's questions, so Elihu gives three examples how God does speak to people, although humans often cannot perceive the response (verse 14; cf. Job 34:23):

1. God speaks through dreams (verses 15–18)
2. God speaks through suffering (verses 19–22)
3. God speaks through a mediator (verses 23–30; a "messenger" or "angel")

The speech concludes with an appeal to Job (called by name, cf. Job 33:1) to speak, although the tone of the statements suggests Job only to "pay attention" and "listen" (verses 31–33).

=== Verses 23–25 ===
[Elihu said:] ^{23} "If there is a messenger for him,

an interpreter, one among a thousand,
to show to man what is right for him,

^{24} then He is gracious to him, and says,

‘Deliver him from going down to the pit;
I have found a ransom.’

^{25} His flesh will be fresher than a child’s;

he will return to the days of his youth;"

- "Messenger": translated from the Hebrew word מַלְאָ֗ךְ mal-’āḵ, which is often rendered as "angel", who could be a human or a heavenly being. This messenger will interpret/mediate God's will, and could be "one out of the thousands of messengers" at God's disposal or a unique messenger (cf. Ecclesiastes 7:28; Job 9:3).
- "Will be fresher": translated from the Hebrew word רֻטֲפַשׁ, rutafash, which is found nowhere else in the Hebrew Bible, and can be interpreted based on the Hebrew word יִרְטַב, yirtav, "to become fresh", with a connection to רָטַב, ratav, "to be well watered [or moist]", or as a combination of רָטַב, ratav ("to be well watered"), and טָפַשׁ, tafash ("to grow fat").

== See also ==
- Job
- Redemption (theology)
- God Shaddai (Almighty)
- Vision (spirituality)
- Related Bible parts: Job 10, Job 13, Job 32

== Sources ==
- Alter, Robert (2010). The Wisdom Books: Job, Proverbs, and Ecclesiastes: A Translation with Commentary. W.W. Norton & Co. ISBN 978-0393080735.
- Coogan, Michael David (2007). Coogan, Michael David; Brettler, Marc Zvi; Newsom, Carol Ann; Perkins, Pheme (eds.). The New Oxford Annotated Bible with the Apocryphal/Deuterocanonical Books: New Revised Standard Version, Issue 48 (Augmented 3rd ed.). Oxford University Press. ISBN 9780195288810.
- Crenshaw, James L. (2007). "17. Job". In Barton, John; Muddiman, John (eds.). The Oxford Bible Commentary (first (paperback) ed.). Oxford University Press. pp. 331–355. ISBN 978-0199277186.
- Estes, Daniel J. (2013). Walton, John H.; Strauss, Mark L. (eds.). Job. Teach the Text Commentary Series. United States: Baker Publishing Group. ISBN 9781441242778.
- Farmer, Kathleen A. (1998). "The Wisdom Books". In McKenzie, Steven L.; Graham, Matt Patrick (eds.). The Hebrew Bible Today: An Introduction to Critical Issues. Westminster John Knox Press. ISBN 978-0-66425652-4.
- Fitzmyer, Joseph A. (2008). A Guide to the Dead Sea Scrolls and Related Literature. Grand Rapids, MI: William B. Eerdmans Publishing Company. ISBN 9780802862419.
- Halley, Henry H. (1965). Halley's Bible Handbook: an abbreviated Bible commentary (24th (revised) ed.). Zondervan Publishing House. ISBN 0-310-25720-4.
- Kugler, Robert; Hartin, Patrick J. (2009). An Introduction to the Bible. Eerdmans. ISBN 978-0-8028-4636-5.
- Ulrich, Eugene, ed. (2010). The Biblical Qumran Scrolls: Transcriptions and Textual Variants. Brill.
- Walton, John H. (2012). Job. United States: Zondervan. ISBN 9780310492009.
- Wilson, Lindsay (2015). Job. United States: Wm. B. Eerdmans Publishing Company. ISBN 9781467443289.
- Würthwein, Ernst (1995). The Text of the Old Testament. Translated by Rhodes, Erroll F. Grand Rapids, MI: Wm. B. Eerdmans. ISBN 0-8028-0788-7.
