= Job 35 =

35th chapter of the Book of Job

- ← chapter 34 chapter 36 →
- The whole Book of Job in the Leningrad Codex (1008 C.E.) from an old facsimile edition.
- Book: Book of Job
- Hebrew Bible part: Ketuvim
- Order in the Hebrew part: 3
- Category: Sifrei Emet
- Christian Bible part: Old Testament
- Order in the Christian part: 18

Job 35 is the 35th chapter of the Book of Job in the Hebrew Bible or the Old Testament of the Christian Bible. The book is anonymous; most scholars believe it was written around 6th century BCE. This chapter records the speech of Elihu, which belongs to the "Verdicts" section of the book, comprising Job 32:1–42:6.

== Text ==
The original text is written in Hebrew language. This chapter is divided into 16 verses.

=== Textual witnesses ===
Some early manuscripts containing the text of this chapter in Hebrew are of the Masoretic Text, which includes the Aleppo Codex (10th century), and Codex Leningradensis (1008). Fragments containing parts of this chapter in Hebrew were found among the Dead Sea Scrolls including 4Q99 (4QJob^{a}; 175–60 BCE) with extant verse 16.

There is also a translation into Koine Greek known as the Septuagint, made in the last few centuries BCE; some extant ancient manuscripts of this version include Codex Vaticanus (B; $\mathfrak{G}$^{B}; 4th century), Codex Sinaiticus (S; BHK: $\mathfrak{G}$^{S}; 4th century), and Codex Alexandrinus (A; $\mathfrak{G}$^{A}; 5th century).

== Analysis ==
The structure of the book is as follows:

- The Prologue (chapters 1–2)
- The Dialogue (chapters 3–31)
- The Verdicts (32:1–42:6)
- The Epilogue (42:7–17)

Within the structure, chapter 35 is grouped into the Verdict section with the following outline:

- Elihu's Verdict (32:1–37:24)
  - Prose Introduction of Elihu (32:1–5)
  - Elihu's Apology (32:6–22)
  - A Transition from Apology to Argument (33:1–7)
  - Elihu's First Speech (33:8–33)
  - Elihu's Second Speech (34:1–37)
  - Elihu's Third Speech (35:1–16)
    - Citation of Job's Charges (35:1–3)
    - The Effect of Wickedness and Righteousness on God (35:4–8)
    - Why God May Not Answer Cries for Help (35:9–13)
    - Job's Pursuit of Litigation Is Empty (35:14–16)
  - Elihu's Fourth Speech (36:1–37:24)
- God's Appearance (Yahweh Speeches) and Job's Responses (38:1–42:6)
  - God's First Speech (38:1–40:2)
  - Job's First Reply – An Insufficient Response (40:3–5)
  - God's Second Speech (40:6–41:34)
  - Job's Second Reply (42:1–6)

The section containing Elihu's speeches serves as a bridge between the Dialogue (chapters 3–31) and the speeches of YHWH (chapters 38–41). There is an introduction in the prose form (Job 32:1–5), describing Elihu's identity and circumstances that cause him to speak (starting in Job 32:6). The whole speech section can be formally divided into four monologues, each starting with a similar formula (Job 32:6; 34:1; 35:1; 36:1). Elihu's first monologue is preceded by an apologia (justification) for speaking (Job 32:6–22) and a transitionary part which introduces Elihu's main arguments (Job 33:1–7) before the speech formally commences (Job 33:8–33).

In the first three speeches Elihu cites and then disputes specific Job's charges in the preceding dialogue:

| Job's charges | Elihu's response |
|---|---|
| Job 33:8–11 | Job 33:12–30 |
| Job 34:5–9 | Job 34:10–33 |
| Job 35:2–3 | Job 35:4–13 |

The third speech of Elihu in chapter 35 opens with citing other Job's charges (Job 35:2–3) and disputing them (verses 4–13) before giving the conclusion (verses 14–16). The focus of the speech is that the transcendent God is not dependent on human beings (verses 4–8), so there is no obligation for God to answer cries for help (verses 9–13).

In chapters 36–37 Elihu stops refuting Job's charges, but states his conclusions and verdict:

1. A summon to Job (Job 36:1–21)
2. A hymn of praise to God as creator (Job 36:22–37:13)
3. A concluding address to Job (Job 37:14–24)

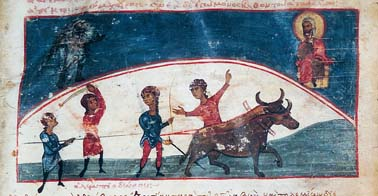
Book of Job in Illuminated Byzantine Manuscripts with Cyclic Illustration (AD 1400). Bibliothèque Nationale. Paris.

== Elihu challenges Job's motivation (35:1–3) ==
In this section Elihu compiles Job's various words (Job 7:19–20; 9:22–31 and 21:7–13) that state no advantage (or "blessings") for choosing righteousness over sin. None of these words seem to draw any response from God, according to Job (verses 2–3).

=== Verse 3 ===
[Elihu said:] "For you said, ‘What advantage will it be to me?

What profit will I have if I am cleansed from my sin?‘"

- "What profit will I have…": the Hebrew text can be rendered as "What do I gain from my sin?", but as Job has claimed that he has not sinned, this has to be elliptical: "more than if I had sinned" or could also be, "What do I gain without sin?".

== Elihu's third speech (35:4–16) ==
Elihu directs his speech to Job and his friends, so the words serve as corrections for all of them. The main point of Elihu is that neither human righteousness nor wickedness will affect or benefit God, so the divine silence demonstrate the sovereign transcendence of God as the Creator. A person may be crying for help but not be seeking God (verse 10a), so they may want help from God, but not God himself. However, God is also the one "who gives song in the night", that is, God is present even in the midst of difficult times (Psalm 23:4).

=== Verse 14 ===
[Elihu said:] "IAlthough you say you do not see Him,

yet judgment is before Him,
and you must trust in Him."

- "You must trust in Him": or "you must wait for Him"

== See also ==
- Divine judgment
- Job
- God Shaddai (Almighty)
- Sin
- Related Bible parts: Job 7, Job 9, Job 21

== Sources ==
- Alter, Robert (2010). The Wisdom Books: Job, Proverbs, and Ecclesiastes: A Translation with Commentary. W.W. Norton & Co. ISBN 978-0393080735.
- Coogan, Michael David (2007). Coogan, Michael David; Brettler, Marc Zvi; Newsom, Carol Ann; Perkins, Pheme (eds.). The New Oxford Annotated Bible with the Apocryphal/Deuterocanonical Books: New Revised Standard Version, Issue 48 (Augmented 3rd ed.). Oxford University Press. ISBN 9780195288810.
- Crenshaw, James L. (2007). "17. Job". In Barton, John; Muddiman, John (eds.). The Oxford Bible Commentary (first (paperback) ed.). Oxford University Press. pp. 331–355. ISBN 978-0199277186.
- Estes, Daniel J. (2013). Walton, John H.; Strauss, Mark L. (eds.). Job. Teach the Text Commentary Series. United States: Baker Publishing Group. ISBN 9781441242778.
- Farmer, Kathleen A. (1998). "The Wisdom Books". In McKenzie, Steven L.; Graham, Matt Patrick (eds.). The Hebrew Bible Today: An Introduction to Critical Issues. Westminster John Knox Press. ISBN 978-0-66425652-4.
- Fitzmyer, Joseph A. (2008). A Guide to the Dead Sea Scrolls and Related Literature. Grand Rapids, MI: William B. Eerdmans Publishing Company. ISBN 9780802862419.
- Halley, Henry H. (1965). Halley's Bible Handbook: an abbreviated Bible commentary (24th (revised) ed.). Zondervan Publishing House. ISBN 0-310-25720-4.
- Kugler, Robert; Hartin, Patrick J. (2009). An Introduction to the Bible. Eerdmans. ISBN 978-0-8028-4636-5.
- Ulrich, Eugene, ed. (2010). The Biblical Qumran Scrolls: Transcriptions and Textual Variants. Brill.
- Walton, John H. (2012). Job. United States: Zondervan. ISBN 9780310492009.
- Wilson, Lindsay (2015). Job. United States: Wm. B. Eerdmans Publishing Company. ISBN 9781467443289.
- Würthwein, Ernst (1995). The Text of the Old Testament. Translated by Rhodes, Erroll F. Grand Rapids, MI: Wm. B. Eerdmans. ISBN 0-8028-0788-7.
