= Job 14 =

14th chapter of the Book of Job

- ← chapter 13 chapter 15 →
- The whole Book of Job in the Leningrad Codex (1008 C.E.) from an old facsimile edition.
- Book: Book of Job
- Hebrew Bible part: Ketuvim
- Order in the Hebrew part: 3
- Category: Sifrei Emet
- Christian Bible part: Old Testament
- Order in the Christian part: 18

Job 14 is the fourteenth chapter of the Book of Job in the Hebrew Bible or the Old Testament of the Christian Bible. The book is anonymous; most scholars believe it was written around 6th century BCE. This chapter records the speech of Job, which belongs to the Dialogue section of the book, comprising Job 3:1–31:40.

== Text ==
The original text is written in Hebrew language. This chapter is divided into 22 verses.

=== Textual witnesses ===
Some early manuscripts containing the text of this chapter in Hebrew are of the Masoretic Text, which includes the Aleppo Codex (10th century), and Codex Leningradensis (1008). Fragments containing parts of this chapter in Hebrew were found among the Dead Sea Scrolls including 4Q100 (4QJob^{b}; 50–1 BCE) with extant verses 4–6 and 4Q101 (4QpaleoJob^{c}; 250–150 BCE) with extant verses 13–18.

There is also a translation into Koine Greek known as the Septuagint, made in the last few centuries BC; some extant ancient manuscripts of this version include Codex Vaticanus (B; $\mathfrak{G}$^{B}; 4th century), Codex Sinaiticus (S; BHK: $\mathfrak{G}$^{S}; 4th century), and Codex Alexandrinus (A; $\mathfrak{G}$^{A}; 5th century).

== Analysis ==
The structure of the book is as follows:

- The Prologue (chapters 1–2)
- The Dialogue (chapters 3–31)
- The Verdicts (32:1–42:6)
- The Epilogue (42:7–17)

Within the structure, chapter 14 is grouped into the Dialogue section with the following outline:

- Job's Self-Curse and Self-Lament (3:1–26)
- Round One (4:1–14:22)
  - Eliphaz (4:1–5:27)
  - Job (6:1–7:21)
  - Bildad (8:1–22)
  - Job (9:1–10:22)
  - Zophar (11:1–20)
  - Job (12:1–14:22)
    - The Wicked Prosper but I Am Suffering (12:1–6)
    - God's Hand in Creation (12:7–12)
    - God's Active Control of the World (12:13–25)
    - Job's Stance (13:1–3)
    - Job's Rebuke of His Friends (13:4–12)
    - Addressing the Friends (13:13–19)
    - Addressing God (13:20–28)
    - The Brevity of Human Life (14:1–6)
    - The Lack of Hope for Humans (14:7–12)
    - Job's Imaginative Exploration of Hope (14:13–17)
    - The Lack of Hope – Again (14:18–22)
- Round Two (15:1–21:34)
- Round Three (22:1–27:23)
- Interlude – A Poem on Wisdom (28:1–28)
- Job's Summing Up (29:1–31:40)

The Dialogue section is composed in the format of poetry with distinctive syntax and grammar. Chapters 12 to 14 contain Job's closing speech of the first round, where he directly addresses his friends (12:2–3; 13:2, 4–12). There are two major units in chapter 14, each with a distinct key question:

- Verses 1–6 focus on the brevity of human life, with the key question in verses 3–4.
- Verses 7–22 explore the issue of hope for humans, with the key question in verses 13–17.

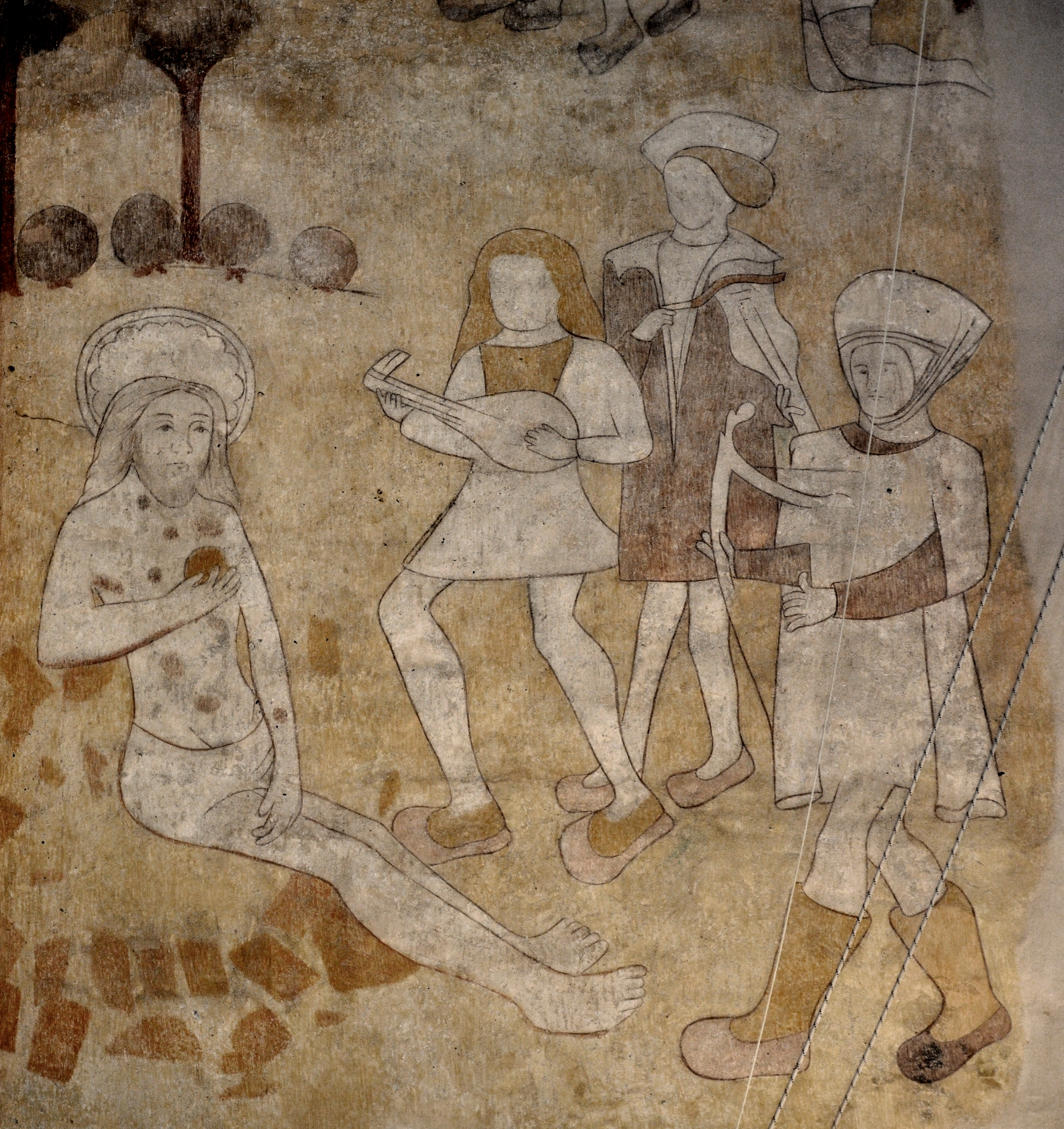
"Job and his friends", on an unknown medieval wall painting in a Dutch Reformed Church, Hattem, Netherlands.

== Job laments the brevity of human life (14:1–6) ==
This section contains Job's laments of his suffering against the backdrop of human sorrow in general (echoing chapter 7). Three phrases ("born of a woman", "few of days" and "full of trouble"; verse 1) and the analogies to "a flower" and "a shadow" (verse 2) emphasize human limitations as well as the brevity of human life. Job attempts to protest that God treats him as a "hired man", which is 'unsuited for his limilations' (verses 5–6).

=== Verse 6 ===
[Job said:] "Look away from him that he may rest,

Till like a hired man he finishes his day."

- "Rest": or "cease", from the Hebrew verb חָדַל, khadal ('to desist, to cease'), so it would mean here 'and let him desist' or 'and let him rest'.

Here Job depicts humans as "hired laborers" under a harsh taskmaster, so 'life becomes mere tedium driven by obligation and fear', instead of 'joyful service to a caring master'.

== Job laments the lack of hope for humans (14:7–22) ==
There are three units in this section:

- Verses 7–12 point to lack of hope for humanity
- Verses 13–17 provide the key question as well as Job's imaginative exploration of hope
- Verses 18–22 revisit the lack of hope for humanity.

The center point is that Job wants God to 'remember' him (verse 13; cf. Job 7:7, 10:9) and protect him from divine wrath, believing that God is in charge, although in the ways that Job does not fully understand.

=== Verse 13 ===
[Job said:] "Oh, that You would hide me in the grave,

that You would conceal me until Your wrath is past,

that You would appoint me a set time

and remember me!"

- "Hide me in the grave": seems to be in contrast to Job's revulsion of the grave in other parts of his speeches (Job 7:9; 17:16), because Job thinks the afterlife is 'an unpleasant prospect of joyless semi-existence', instead of 'a joyful anticipation'.
- "The grave": translated from the Hebrew term "Sheol", which in the Bible refers to 'the place where the dead go'.

== See also ==
- Afterlife
- Death
- Divine retribution
- Sin
- Suffering
- Related Bible parts: Job 12, Job 13, Job 31

== Sources ==
- Alter, Robert (2010). The Wisdom Books: Job, Proverbs, and Ecclesiastes: A Translation with Commentary. W.W. Norton & Co. ISBN 978-0393080735.
- Coogan, Michael David (2007). Coogan, Michael David; Brettler, Marc Zvi; Newsom, Carol Ann; Perkins, Pheme (eds.). The New Oxford Annotated Bible with the Apocryphal/Deuterocanonical Books: New Revised Standard Version, Issue 48 (Augmented 3rd ed.). Oxford University Press. ISBN 9780195288810.
- Crenshaw, James L. (2007). "17. Job". In Barton, John; Muddiman, John (eds.). The Oxford Bible Commentary (first (paperback) ed.). Oxford University Press. pp. 331–355. ISBN 978-0199277186.
- Estes, Daniel J. (2013). Walton, John H.; Strauss, Mark L. (eds.). Job. Teach the Text Commentary Series. United States: Baker Publishing Group. ISBN 9781441242778.
- Farmer, Kathleen A. (1998). "The Wisdom Books". In McKenzie, Steven L.; Graham, Matt Patrick (eds.). The Hebrew Bible Today: An Introduction to Critical Issues. Westminster John Knox Press. ISBN 978-0-66425652-4.
- Fitzmyer, Joseph A. (2008). A Guide to the Dead Sea Scrolls and Related Literature. Grand Rapids, MI: William B. Eerdmans Publishing Company. ISBN 9780802862419.
- Halley, Henry H. (1965). Halley's Bible Handbook: an abbreviated Bible commentary (24th (revised) ed.). Zondervan Publishing House. ISBN 0-310-25720-4.
- Kugler, Robert; Hartin, Patrick J. (2009). An Introduction to the Bible. Eerdmans. ISBN 978-0-8028-4636-5.
- Ulrich, Eugene, ed. (2010). The Biblical Qumran Scrolls: Transcriptions and Textual Variants. Brill.
- Walton, John H. (2012). Job. United States: Zondervan. ISBN 9780310492009.
- Wilson, Lindsay (2015). Job. United States: Wm. B. Eerdmans Publishing Company. ISBN 9781467443289.
- Würthwein, Ernst (1995). The Text of the Old Testament. Translated by Rhodes, Erroll F. Grand Rapids, MI: Wm. B. Eerdmans. ISBN 0-8028-0788-7.
