= Job 13 =

13th chapter of the Book of Job

- ← chapter 12 chapter 14 →
- The whole Book of Job in the Leningrad Codex (1008 C.E.) from an old facsimile edition.
- Book: Book of Job
- Hebrew Bible part: Ketuvim
- Order in the Hebrew part: 3
- Category: Sifrei Emet
- Christian Bible part: Old Testament
- Order in the Christian part: 18

Job 13 is the thirteenth chapter of the Book of Job in the Hebrew Bible or the Old Testament of the Christian Bible. The book is anonymous; most scholars believe it was written around 6th century BCE. This chapter records the speech of Job, which belongs to the Dialogue section of the book, comprising Job 3:1–31:40.

== Text ==
The original text is written in Hebrew language. This chapter is divided into 28 verses.

=== Textual witnesses ===
Some early manuscripts containing the text of this chapter in Hebrew are of the Masoretic Text, which includes the Aleppo Codex (10th century), and Codex Leningradensis (1008). Fragments containing parts of this chapter in Hebrew were found among the Dead Sea Scrolls including 4Q100 (4QJob^{b}; 50–1 BCE) with extant verse 4 and 4Q101 (4QpaleoJob^{c}; 250–150 BCE) with extant verses 18–27.

There is also a translation into Koine Greek known as the Septuagint, made in the last few centuries BC; some extant ancient manuscripts of this version include Codex Vaticanus (B; $\mathfrak{G}$^{B}; 4th century), Codex Sinaiticus (S; BHK: $\mathfrak{G}$^{S}; 4th century), and Codex Alexandrinus (A; $\mathfrak{G}$^{A}; 5th century).

== Analysis ==
The structure of the book is as follows:

- The Prologue (chapters 1–2)
- The Dialogue (chapters 3–31)
- The Verdicts (32:1–42:6)
- The Epilogue (42:7–17)

Within the structure, chapter 13 is grouped into the Dialogue section with the following outline:

- Job's Self-Curse and Self-Lament (3:1–26)
- Round One (4:1–14:22)
  - Eliphaz (4:1–5:27)
  - Job (6:1–7:21)
  - Bildad (8:1–22)
  - Job (9:1–10:22)
  - Zophar (11:1–20)
  - Job (12:1–14:22)
    - The Wicked Prosper but I Am Suffering (12:1–6)
    - God's Hand in Creation (12:7–12)
    - God's Active Control of the World (12:13–25)
    - Job's Stance (13:1–3)
    - Job's Rebuke of His Friends (13:4–12)
    - Addressing the Friends (13:13–19)
    - Addressing God (13:20–28)
    - The Brevity of Human Life (14:1–6)
    - The Lack of Hope for Humans (14:7–12)
    - Job's Imaginative Exploration of Hope (14:13–17)
    - The Lack of Hope – Again (14:18–22)
- Round Two (15:1–21:34)
- Round Three (22:1–27:23)
- Interlude – A Poem on Wisdom (28:1–28)
- Job's Summing Up (29:1–31:40)

The Dialogue section is composed in the format of poetry with distinctive syntax and grammar. Chapters 12 to 14 contain Job's closing speech of the first round, where he directly addresses his friends (12:2–3; 13:2, 4–12).

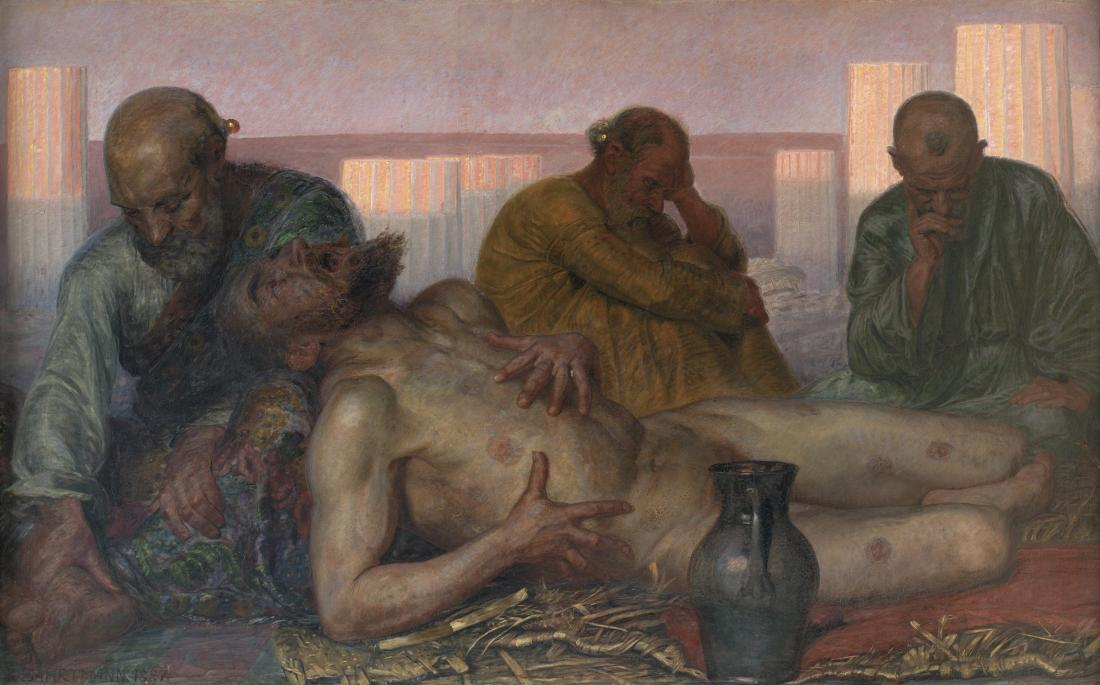
"Job and his friends", by Kristian Zahrtmann (1887).

== Job addresses his friends (13:1–19) ==
Verse 1 opens with Job summing up his speech in chapter 12 before he addresses his friends in verses 2–12, contrasting Job's stance ("but I", verse 3) and his friends' ("but you", verse 4). Job calls for silence from his friends (verse 5, 13) as he wants to 'boldly pursue truth as he comes before God'. Although Job was afraid to approach God (verses 13b-14, also verse 21), he would press for litigation, knowing the risk and yet the hope for vindication (as in chapter 14).

=== Verse 15 ===
[Job said:] "Though He slay me, yet will I trust in Him,

but I will defend my own ways before Him."

- "In Him": from the Hebrew written text (kethib or ketiv) לֹא, loʾ (could be rendered as "not"), but here is read (Qere) as לוֹ, "to him"). The RSV renders as: "Behold, he will slay me, I have no hope", whereas the NIV renders as "though he slay me, yet will I hope in him".

== Job addresses God (13:20–28) ==
At verse 20, Job switches his address to God who can give and withhold a solution to his problems. Verses 20–27 can be classified as a lament, outlining what Job wants God to address the number of his sins to warrant the extent of punishments he has received. The closing remark is an imagery about a person without dignity, rotting away or destroyed by moths.

=== Verse 26 ===
[Job said:] "For You write bitter things against me

and make me inherit the iniquities of my youth."

Job acknowledges that he committed sins in his youth (or 'youthful years'; cf. Psalm 25:7), but he had doubtless confessed them before and now wonders if his suffering is the long-delayed punishment for those past sins, which God has recorded and remembered. In Job 31:35, Job will use the same metaphor that he writes and signs his confession and places his case in God's hands.

== See also ==
- Divine Providence
- Righteousness
- Related Bible parts: Job 9, Job 16, Job 42

== Sources ==
- Alter, Robert (2010). The Wisdom Books: Job, Proverbs, and Ecclesiastes: A Translation with Commentary. W.W. Norton & Co. ISBN 978-0393080735.
- Coogan, Michael David (2007). Coogan, Michael David; Brettler, Marc Zvi; Newsom, Carol Ann; Perkins, Pheme (eds.). The New Oxford Annotated Bible with the Apocryphal/Deuterocanonical Books: New Revised Standard Version, Issue 48 (Augmented 3rd ed.). Oxford University Press. ISBN 9780195288810.
- Crenshaw, James L. (2007). "17. Job". In Barton, John; Muddiman, John (eds.). The Oxford Bible Commentary (first (paperback) ed.). Oxford University Press. pp. 331–355. ISBN 978-0199277186.
- Estes, Daniel J. (2013). Walton, John H.; Strauss, Mark L. (eds.). Job. Teach the Text Commentary Series. United States: Baker Publishing Group. ISBN 9781441242778.
- Farmer, Kathleen A. (1998). "The Wisdom Books". In McKenzie, Steven L.; Graham, Matt Patrick (eds.). The Hebrew Bible Today: An Introduction to Critical Issues. Westminster John Knox Press. ISBN 978-0-66425652-4.
- Fitzmyer, Joseph A. (2008). A Guide to the Dead Sea Scrolls and Related Literature. Grand Rapids, MI: William B. Eerdmans Publishing Company. ISBN 9780802862419.
- Halley, Henry H. (1965). Halley's Bible Handbook: an abbreviated Bible commentary (24th (revised) ed.). Zondervan Publishing House. ISBN 0-310-25720-4.
- Kugler, Robert; Hartin, Patrick J. (2009). An Introduction to the Bible. Eerdmans. ISBN 978-0-8028-4636-5.
- Ulrich, Eugene, ed. (2010). The Biblical Qumran Scrolls: Transcriptions and Textual Variants. Brill.
- Walton, John H. (2012). Job. United States: Zondervan. ISBN 9780310492009.
- Wilson, Lindsay (2015). Job. United States: Wm. B. Eerdmans Publishing Company. ISBN 9781467443289.
- Würthwein, Ernst (1995). The Text of the Old Testament. Translated by Rhodes, Erroll F. Grand Rapids, MI: Wm. B. Eerdmans. ISBN 0-8028-0788-7.
