= Job 12 =

12th chapter of the Book of Job

- ← chapter 11 chapter 13 →
- The whole Book of Job in the Leningrad Codex (1008 C.E.) from an old facsimile edition.
- Book: Book of Job
- Hebrew Bible part: Ketuvim
- Order in the Hebrew part: 3
- Category: Sifrei Emet
- Christian Bible part: Old Testament
- Order in the Christian part: 18

Job 12 is the twelfth chapter of the Book of Job in the Hebrew Bible or the Old Testament of the Christian Bible. The book is anonymous; most scholars believe it was written around 6th century BCE. This chapter records the speech of Job, which belongs to the Dialogue section of the book, comprising Job 3:1–31:40.

== Text ==
The original text is written in Hebrew language. This chapter is divided into 25 verses.

=== Textual witnesses ===
Some early manuscripts containing the text of this chapter in Hebrew are of the Masoretic Text, which includes the Aleppo Codex (10th century), and Codex Leningradensis (1008).

There is also a translation into Koine Greek known as the Septuagint, made in the last few centuries BCE; some extant ancient manuscripts of this version include Codex Vaticanus (B; $\mathfrak{G}$^{B}; 4th century), Codex Sinaiticus (S; BHK: $\mathfrak{G}$^{S}; 4th century), and Codex Alexandrinus (A; $\mathfrak{G}$^{A}; 5th century).

== Analysis ==
The structure of the book is as follows:

- The Prologue (chapters 1–2)
- The Dialogue (chapters 3–31)
- The Verdicts (32:1–42:6)
- The Epilogue (42:7–17)

Within the structure, chapter 12 is grouped into the Dialogue section with the following outline:

- Job's Self-Curse and Self-Lament (3:1–26)
- Round One (4:1–14:22)
  - Eliphaz (4:1–5:27)
  - Job (6:1–7:21)
  - Bildad (8:1–22)
  - Job (9:1–10:22)
  - Zophar (11:1–20)
  - Job (12:1–14:22)
    - The Wicked Prosper but I Am Suffering (12:1–6)
    - God's Hand in Creation (12:7–12)
    - God's Active Control of the World (12:13–25)
    - Job's Stance (13:1–3)
    - Job's Rebuke of His Friends (13:4–12)
    - Addressing the Friends (13:13–19)
    - Addressing God (13:20–28)
    - The Brevity of Human Life (14:1–6)
    - The Lack of Hope for Humans (14:7–12)
    - Job's Imaginative Exploration of Hope (14:13–17)
    - The Lack of Hope – Again (14:18–22)
- Round Two (15:1–21:34)
- Round Three (22:1–27:23)
- Interlude – A Poem on Wisdom (28:1–28)
- Job's Summing Up (29:1–31:40)

The Dialogue section is composed in the format of poetry with distinctive syntax and grammar. Chapters 12 to 14 contain Job's closing speech of the first round, where he directly addresses his friends (12:2–3; 13:2, 4–12).

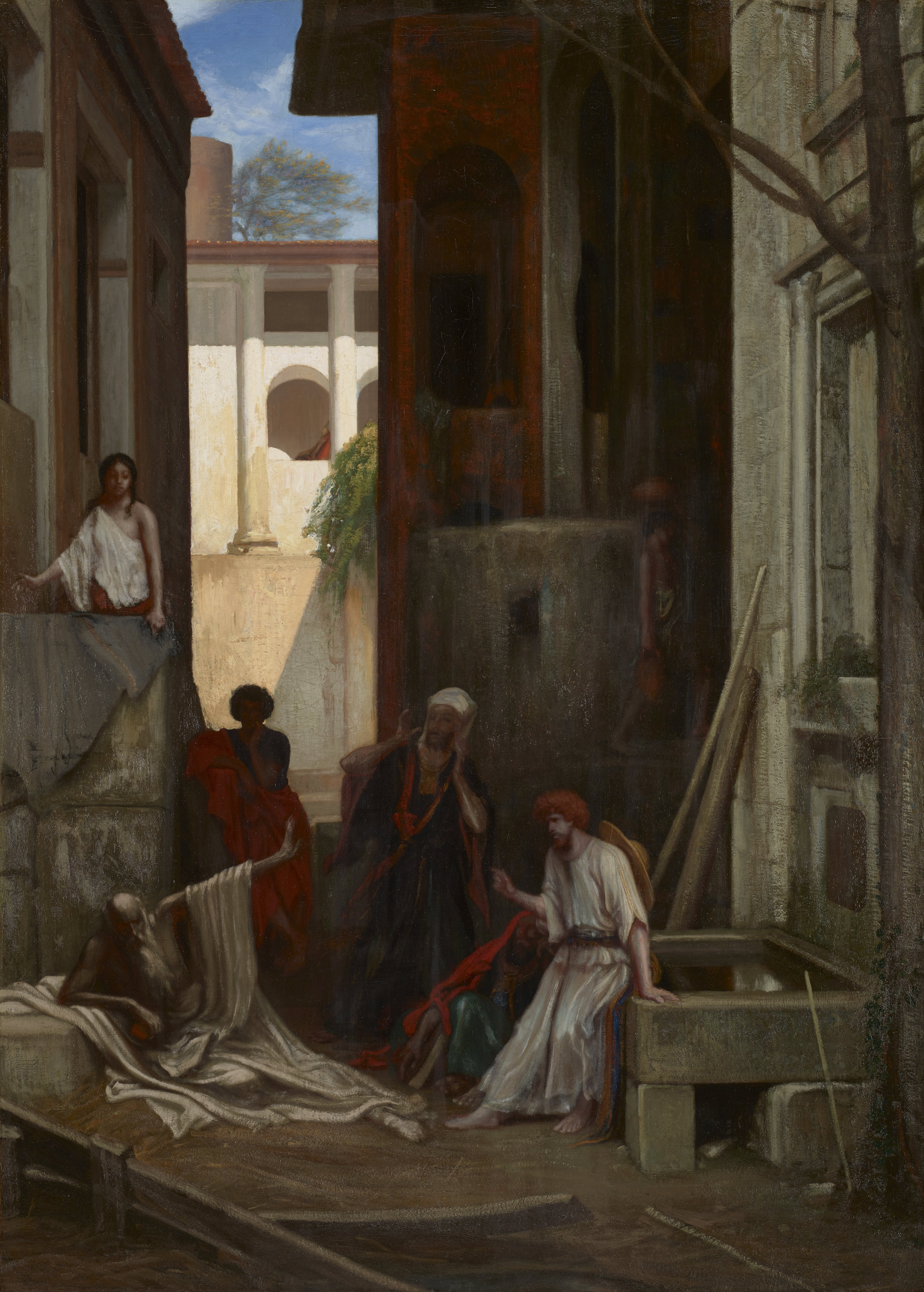
"Job and his friends", by Alexandre-Gabriel Decamps (c. 1852 ).

== Job believes God's hand in creation (12:1–12) ==
Job points out that some who are wicked are prospering, regardless how the righteous is rewarded or is suffering, and that the life of the nature all are in God's hand (verse 9). Job suggests his friends to look behind the 'age-old traditions' and 'past-dogmas' to 'the God who is both the source of all wisdom' and the one in control of all creation (verse 12).

=== Verse 9 ===
[Job said:] "Who among all these does not know

that the hand of the Lord has done this,"

- "The LORD": translated from the Hebrew YHWH, which is the only reference to this name outside the narrative frame (Prologue and Epilogue) or the YHWH speeches (Job 38–41). Three manuscripts of Kennicott and two of de Rossi have the word “God” instead.

=== Verse 10 ===
In whose hand is the life of all living things
and the breath of every human being?

== Job believes God's active control of the worlds (12:13–25) ==
This section follows Job's statements in verse 12 (which can also be read as rhetorical questions) to declare the wisdom and might of God (verse 13) whose sovereign activity can be observed in all areas and situations of life (verses 14–25).

=== Verse 23 ===
[Job said:] "He increases the nations and destroys them;

He enlarges the nations and guides them."

- "Increases": from the Hebrew verb מַשְׂגִּיא, masgiʾ (“makes great”) is a common Aramaic word, but only found in Hebrew text in Job 8:11, 12:23 and 36:24. Some Hebrew manuscripts have a reading derived from שָׁגָה, shagah (“leading astray”), whereas the Greek Septuagint does not have the line.

Job uses the rise and fall of nations, which does not seem to be governed by any moral principle, as an example of God's arbitrary power, which is spelled out in detail in Daniel's interpretation of King Nebuchadnezzar's dream (Daniel 2) how no group of humans can thwart the purpose of God Almighty.

== See also ==
- Divine Providence
- Righteousness
- Related Bible parts: Job 9, Job 16, Job 42

== Sources ==
- Alter, Robert (2010). The Wisdom Books: Job, Proverbs, and Ecclesiastes: A Translation with Commentary. W.W. Norton & Co. ISBN 978-0393080735.
- Coogan, Michael David (2007). Coogan, Michael David; Brettler, Marc Zvi; Newsom, Carol Ann; Perkins, Pheme (eds.). The New Oxford Annotated Bible with the Apocryphal/Deuterocanonical Books: New Revised Standard Version, Issue 48 (Augmented 3rd ed.). Oxford University Press. ISBN 9780195288810.
- Crenshaw, James L. (2007). "17. Job". In Barton, John; Muddiman, John (eds.). The Oxford Bible Commentary (first (paperback) ed.). Oxford University Press. pp. 331–355. ISBN 978-0199277186.
- Estes, Daniel J. (2013). Walton, John H.; Strauss, Mark L. (eds.). Job. Teach the Text Commentary Series. United States: Baker Publishing Group. ISBN 9781441242778.
- Farmer, Kathleen A. (1998). "The Wisdom Books". In McKenzie, Steven L.; Graham, Matt Patrick (eds.). The Hebrew Bible Today: An Introduction to Critical Issues. Westminster John Knox Press. ISBN 978-0-66425652-4.
- Halley, Henry H. (1965). Halley's Bible Handbook: an abbreviated Bible commentary (24th (revised) ed.). Zondervan Publishing House. ISBN 0-310-25720-4.
- Kugler, Robert; Hartin, Patrick J. (2009). An Introduction to the Bible. Eerdmans. ISBN 978-0-8028-4636-5.
- Walton, John H. (2012). Job. United States: Zondervan. ISBN 9780310492009.
- Wilson, Lindsay (2015). Job. United States: Wm. B. Eerdmans Publishing Company. ISBN 9781467443289.
- Würthwein, Ernst (1995). The Text of the Old Testament. Translated by Rhodes, Erroll F. Grand Rapids, MI: Wm. B. Eerdmans. ISBN 0-8028-0788-7.
