= Job 32 =

32nd chapter of the Book of Job

- ← chapter 31 chapter 33 →
- The whole Book of Job in the Leningrad Codex (1008 C.E.) from an old facsimile edition.
- Book: Book of Job
- Hebrew Bible part: Ketuvim
- Order in the Hebrew part: 3
- Category: Sifrei Emet
- Christian Bible part: Old Testament
- Order in the Christian part: 18

Job 32 is the 32nd chapter of the Book of Job in the Hebrew Bible or the Old Testament of the Christian Bible. The book is anonymous; most scholars believe it was written around 6th century BCE. This chapter records the speech of Elihu, which belongs to the "Verdicts" section of the book, comprising Job 32:1–42:6.

== Text ==
The original text is written in Hebrew language. This chapter is divided into 22 verses.

=== Textual witnesses ===
Some early manuscripts containing the text of this chapter in Hebrew are of the Masoretic Text, which includes the Aleppo Codex (10th century), and Codex Leningradensis (1008). Fragments containing parts of this chapter in Hebrew were found among the Dead Sea Scrolls including 4Q99 (4QJob^{a}; 175–60 BCE) with extant verses 3–4.

There is also a translation into Koine Greek known as the Septuagint, made in the last few centuries BCE; some extant ancient manuscripts of this version include Codex Vaticanus (B; $\mathfrak{G}$^{B}; 4th century), Codex Sinaiticus (S; BHK: $\mathfrak{G}$^{S}; 4th century), and Codex Alexandrinus (A; $\mathfrak{G}$^{A}; 5th century).

== Analysis ==
The structure of the book is as follows:

- The Prologue (chapters 1–2)
- The Dialogue (chapters 3–31)
- The Verdicts (32:1–42:6)
- The Epilogue (42:7–17)

Within the structure, chapter 32 is grouped into the Verdict section with the following outline:

- Elihu's Verdict (32:1–37:24)
  - Prose Introduction of Elihu (32:1–5)
  - Elihu's Apology (32:6–22)
  - A Transition from Apology to Argument (33:1–7)
  - Elihu's First Speech (33:8–33)
  - Elihu's Second Speech (34:1–37)
  - Elihu's Third Speech (35:1–16)
  - Elihu's Fourth Speech (36:1–37:24)
- God's Appearance (Yahweh Speeches) and Job's Responses (38:1–42:6)
  - God's First Speech (38:1–40:2)
  - Job's First Reply – An Insufficient Response (40:3–5)
  - God's Second Speech (40:6–41:34)
  - Job's Second Reply (42:1–6)

The section containing Elihu's speeches serves as a bridge between the Dialogue (chapters 3–31) and the speeches of YHWH (chapters 38–41). There is an introduction in the prose form (Job 32:1–5), describing Elihu's identity and circumstances that cause him to speak (starting in Job 32:6). The whole speech section can be formally divided into four monologues, each starting with a similar formula (Job 32:6; 34:1; 35:1; 36:1). Elihu's first monologue is preceded by an apologia (justification) for speaking (Job 32:6–22) and a transitionary part which introduces Elihu's main arguments (Job 33:1–7) before the speech formally commences (Job 33:8–33). In the first three speeches Elihu cites and then disputes specific Job's charges in the preceding dialogue:

Job's charges	Elihu's response
Job 33:8–11	Job 33:12–30
Job 34:5–9	Job 34:10–33
Job 35:2–3	Job 35:4–13

In chapters 36–37 Elihu stops refuting Job's charges, but states his conclusions and verdict:

1. A summon to Job (Job 36:1–21)
2. A hymn of praise to God as creator (Job 36:22–37:13)
3. A concluding address to Job (Job 37:14–24).

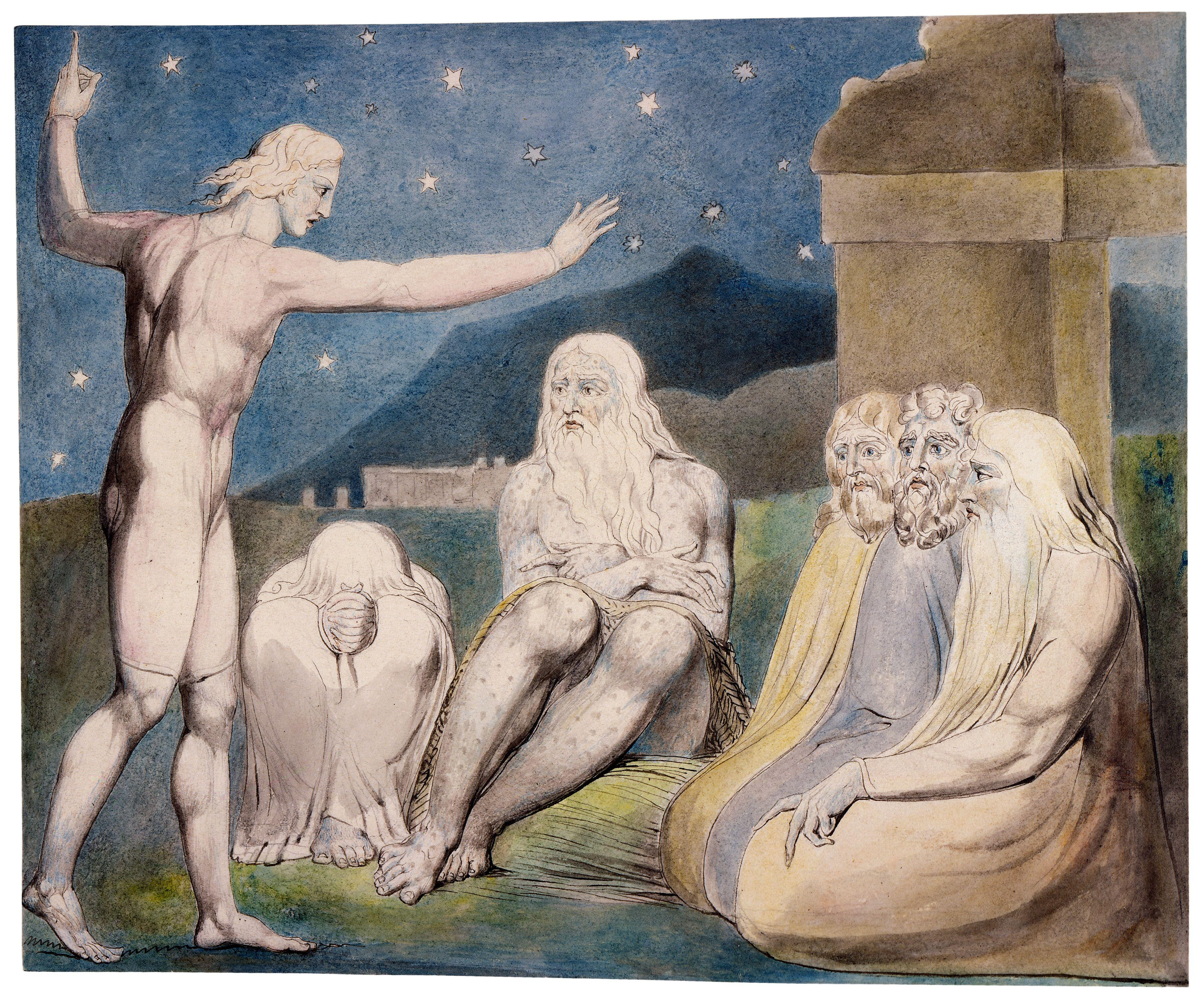
The Wrath of Elihu (1805) by William Blake, from the Illustrations of the Book of Job.

== Prose introduction to Elihu (32:1–5) ==
The section starts by stating the breakdown of the Dialogue that Job's three friends (Eliphaz, Bildad, and Zophar) cease to answer Job (verse 1), and this allows another person, Elihu, to come forward to speak (verse 2). Elihu is described as 'angry' (repeated four times in verses 2 (twice), 3 and 5), first to Job, because Job justified himself rather than God (verse 2), then to the three friends for not providing a (legal) "answer" to Job yet condemning Job (verse 3), and then while waiting for his turn to speak, Elihu is forced by this great anger to give responses to Job (verses 4–5).

=== Verse 1 ===
So these three men ceased to answer Job, because he was righteous in his own eyes.

- "In his own eyes": translated from the Hebrew word בְּעֵינָֽיו, bə-‘ê-nāw; the Greek Septuagint, Syriac, and Symmachus versions have "in their eyes".

=== Verse 2 ===
Then was kindled the wrath of Elihu the son of Barachel the Buzite, of the kindred of Ram: against Job was his wrath kindled, because he justified himself rather than God.

- "Then was kindled the wrath": (at the very beginning of the verse) translated from the Hebrew phrase וַיִּחַר אַף, vayyikhar ʾaf, literally "and the anger became hot", meaning Elihu 'became very angry'.
- "Elihu": literally "He is my God"; the only character in the book of Job mentioned in full name, including the patronymic (family name). His identity as a Buzite (Buz is the brother of Uz in Genesis 22:20–21) places his origin in Edom (cf. Jeremiah 25:23).
- "Rather than": is rendered in the Greek Septuagint and Latin versions as "before God."

== Elihu's apology (32:6–22) ==
This section records Elihu's speech in a form of apologia or justification for his boldness to speak out. At first, Elihu refrains from speaking in the presence of his elders, due to his timidity (verse 6) and his initial belief that wisdom is learned over time (verse 7). However, he is now compelled to speak after realizing that the source of wisdom is not old age but God alone ("the breath of the Almighty") and this gift can be given by God to anyone, including Elihu who is younger than Job and the three friends (verses 8–10, 18). Because of the "spirit" or "wind" (presumably from God) in him, Elihu 'needs' to speak (instead of 'ought' to speak) to find relief (verse 19–20), but he will be impartial (not 'giving any preferential treatment', literally "lift up the face of a person" in verse 21) as he believes that he is accountable before God (verse 22).

=== Verse 8 ===
[Elihu said:] "But there is a spirit in man,

and the breath of the Almighty gives him understanding."

- "Breath": translated from the Hebrew word נְשָׁמָה (neshamah), which is used in Genesis 2:7 as 'breathed into Adam' to make him a living person ("soul"); in this verse is paralleled to the "spirit" (רוּחַ, ruakh), in the first line, which is interpreted by some commentators as the "Spirit of God" (Job 33:4).

== See also ==
- Barachel
- Buz
- Filial piety
- Job
- Ram
- Respect
- God Shaddai (Almighty)
- Wisdom
- Related Bible parts: Job 31, Job 42

== Sources ==
- Alter, Robert (2010). The Wisdom Books: Job, Proverbs, and Ecclesiastes: A Translation with Commentary. W.W. Norton & Co. ISBN 978-0393080735.
- Coogan, Michael David (2007). Coogan, Michael David; Brettler, Marc Zvi; Newsom, Carol Ann; Perkins, Pheme (eds.). The New Oxford Annotated Bible with the Apocryphal/Deuterocanonical Books: New Revised Standard Version, Issue 48 (Augmented 3rd ed.). Oxford University Press. ISBN 9780195288810.
- Crenshaw, James L. (2007). "17. Job". In Barton, John; Muddiman, John (eds.). The Oxford Bible Commentary (first (paperback) ed.). Oxford University Press. pp. 331–355. ISBN 978-0199277186.
- Estes, Daniel J. (2013). Walton, John H.; Strauss, Mark L. (eds.). Job. Teach the Text Commentary Series. United States: Baker Publishing Group. ISBN 9781441242778.
- Farmer, Kathleen A. (1998). "The Wisdom Books". In McKenzie, Steven L.; Graham, Matt Patrick (eds.). The Hebrew Bible Today: An Introduction to Critical Issues. Westminster John Knox Press. ISBN 978-0-66425652-4.
- Fitzmyer, Joseph A. (2008). A Guide to the Dead Sea Scrolls and Related Literature. Grand Rapids, MI: William B. Eerdmans Publishing Company. ISBN 9780802862419.
- Halley, Henry H. (1965). Halley's Bible Handbook: an abbreviated Bible commentary (24th (revised) ed.). Zondervan Publishing House. ISBN 0-310-25720-4.
- Kugler, Robert; Hartin, Patrick J. (2009). An Introduction to the Bible. Eerdmans. ISBN 978-0-8028-4636-5.
- Ulrich, Eugene, ed. (2010). The Biblical Qumran Scrolls: Transcriptions and Textual Variants. Brill.
- Walton, John H. (2012). Job. United States: Zondervan. ISBN 9780310492009.
- Wilson, Lindsay (2015). Job. United States: Wm. B. Eerdmans Publishing Company. ISBN 9781467443289.
- Würthwein, Ernst (1995). The Text of the Old Testament. Translated by Rhodes, Erroll F. Grand Rapids, MI: Wm. B. Eerdmans. ISBN 0-8028-0788-7.
