= Chukat =

Hebrew for "decree"

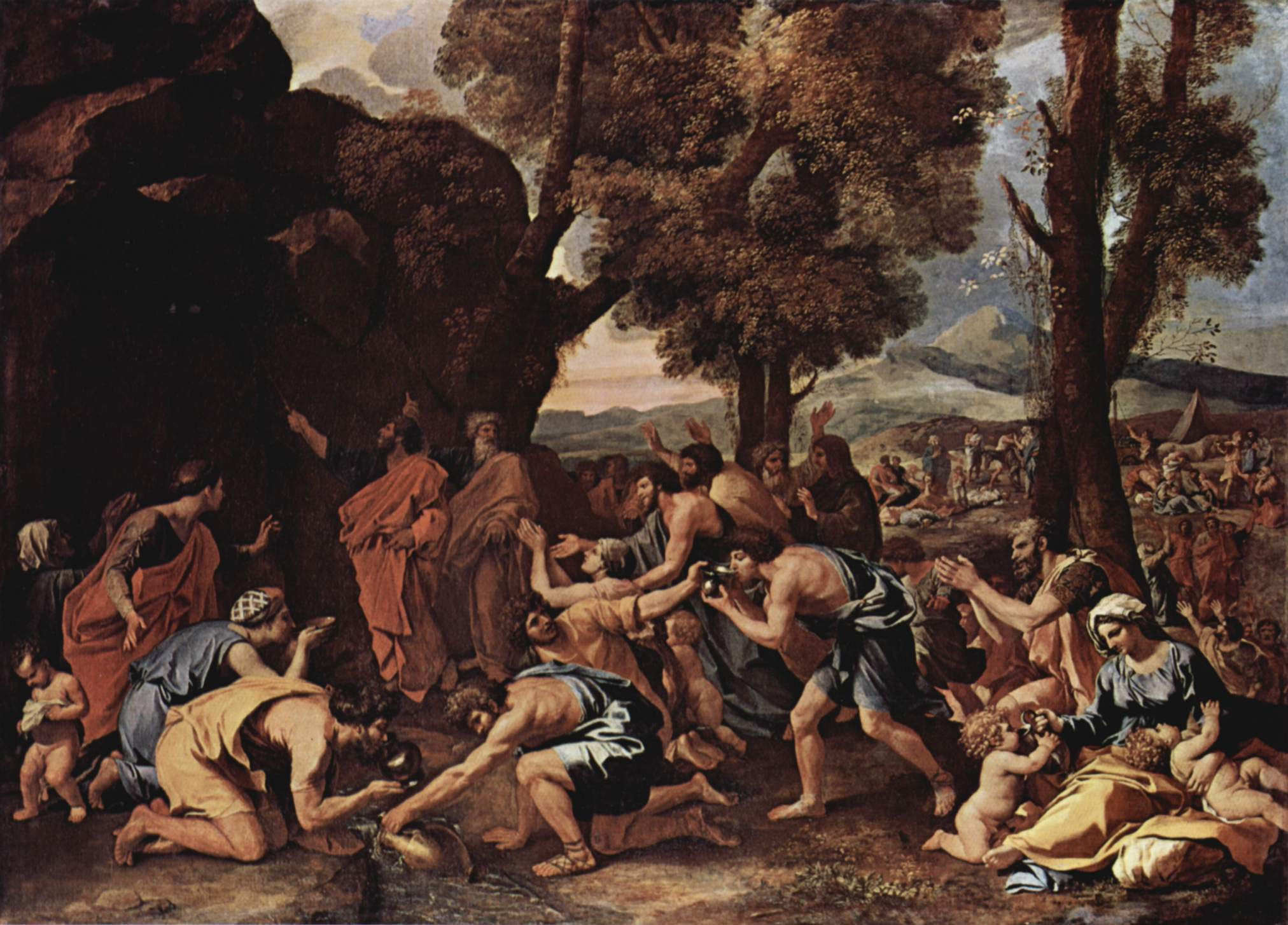
Moses Striking Water from the Rock (painting circa 1633–1635 by Nicolas Poussin)

Chukat, Huqqat, or Khukes (חֻקַּת ḥuqqaṯ, 'decree', the ninth word and the first distinctive word) is the 39th weekly Torah portion in the annual triennial cycle of Rabbinic and the sixth in the Book of Numbers. The parashah sets out the laws of corpse contamination (tumat hamet) and purification with the water of lustration prepared with the red heifer. It also reports the deaths of Miriam and Aaron, the failure of Moses at the Waters of Meribah, and the conquest of Arad, the Amorites, and Bashan. The parashah comprises Numbers 19:1–22:1. The parashah is the shortest weekly Torah portion in the Book of Numbers (although not the shortest in the Torah), and is made up of 4,670 Hebrew letters, 1,245 Hebrew words, 87 verses, and 159 lines in a Torah Scroll.

Rabbinic Jews generally read it in late June or July. In most years (for example, in 2025 and 2028), Parashat Chukat is read separately. In some years (for example, 2026 and 2027) when the second day of Shavuot falls on Shabbat in the Jewish diaspora (where observant Jews observe Shavuot for two days), Parashat Huqqat is combined with the subsequent parashah, Balak, in the Diaspora to synchronize readings thereafter with those in the Holy Land, where Jews observe Shavuot for one day.

Jews also read the first part of the parashah, Numbers 19:1–22, in addition to the regular weekly Torah portion, on the Shabbat after Purim, called Shabbat Parah. On Shabbat Parah, a reader first reads the regular weekly Torah portion, then reads the chapter of the Red Cow. Shabbat Parah occurs shortly before Passover, and Numbers 19:1–22 sets out the procedure by which the Israelites could purify themselves from the impurity of death (tumat hamet), and so prepare for the Pilgrimage Festival of Passover. s

== Readings ==
In traditional Sabbath Torah reading, the parashah is divided into seven readings, or עליות, aliyot.

The World Cow (1913 painting by Franz Marc)

=== First reading—Numbers 19:1–17 ===
In the first reading, God told Moses and Aaron to instruct the Israelites regarding the ritual law of the Red Cow (פָרָה אֲדֻמָּה, parah adumah) used to create the water of lustration. The cow was to be without blemish, have no defect, and not have borne a yoke. Eleazar the priest was to take it outside the camp, observe its slaughter, and take some of its blood with his finger and sprinkle it seven times toward the Tabernacle. The cow was to be burned in its entirety along with cedar wood, hyssop, and crimson wool. The priest and the one who burned the cow were both to wash their garments, bathe in water, and be unclean until evening. The ashes of the cow were to be used to create the water of lustration. One who touched the corpse of any human being was to be unclean for seven days. On the third and seventh days, the person who had touched the corpse was to cleanse with the water of lustration and then be clean. One who failed to do so would remain unclean, would defile the Tabernacle, and would be cut off from Israel. When a person died in a tent, whoever entered the tent was to be unclean seven days, and every open vessel in the tent was to be unclean. In the open, anyone who touched a corpse, bone, or a grave was to be unclean seven days.

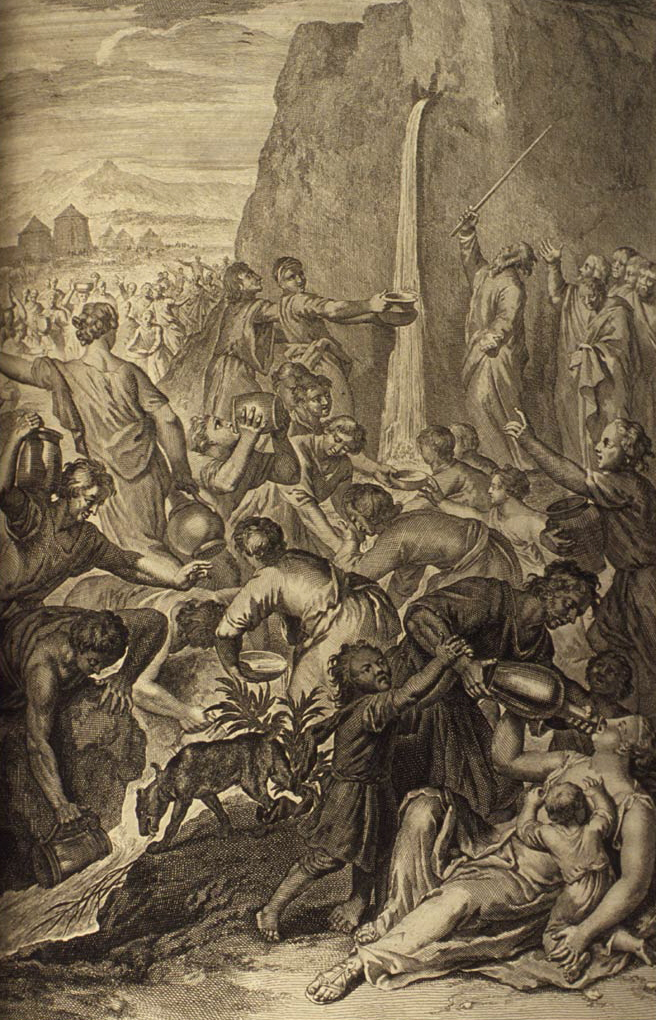
Moses Brings Water Out of the Rock (illustration from the 1728 Figures de la Bible)

=== Second reading—Numbers 19:18–20:6 ===
In the second reading, a person who was clean was to add fresh water to ashes of the Red Cow, dip hyssop it in the water, and sprinkle the water on the tent, the vessels, and people who had become unclean. The person who sprinkled the water was then to wash his clothes, bathe in water, and be clean at nightfall. Anyone who became unclean and failed to cleanse himself was to be cut off from the congregation. The person who sprinkled the water of lustration was to wash his clothes, and whoever touched the water of lustration, whatever he touched, and whoever touched him were to be unclean until evening. The Israelites arrived at Kadesh in the wilderness of Zin, and Miriam died and was buried there. The people were without water, and they complained against Moses and Aaron. Moses and Aaron fell on their faces at the entrance of the Tent of Meeting, and the Presence of God appeared to them.

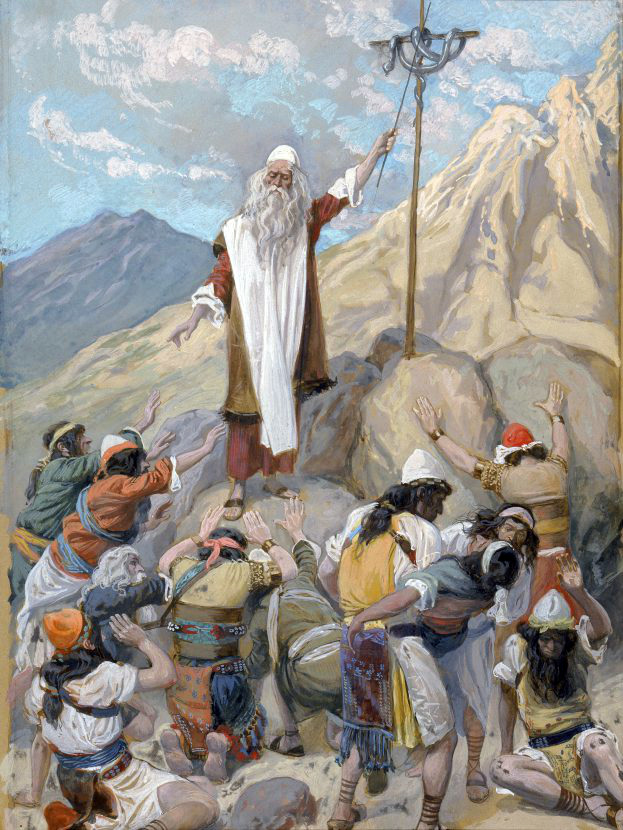
The Brazen Serpent (watercolor circa 1896–1902 by James Tissot)

=== Third reading—Numbers 20:7–13 ===
In the third reading, God told Moses that he and Aaron should take the rod and order the rock to yield its water. Moses took the rod, assembled the congregation in front of the rock, and said to them: "Listen, you rebels, shall we get water for you out of this rock?" Then Moses struck the rock twice with his rod, out came water, and the community and their animals drank. But God told Moses and Aaron: "Because you did not trust Me enough to affirm My sanctity in the sight of the Israelite people, therefore you shall not lead this congregation into the land that I have given them." The water was named Meribah, meaning quarrel or contention."

=== Fourth reading—Numbers 20:14–21 ===
In the fourth reading, Moses sent messengers to the king of Edom asking him to allow the Israelites to cross Edom, without passing through fields or vineyards, and without drinking water from wells. But the Edomites would not let the Israelites pass through, and turned out in heavy force to block their way, and the Israelites turned away.

=== Fifth reading—Numbers 20:22–21:9 ===
In the fifth reading, at Mount Hor, God told Moses and Aaron: "Let Aaron be gathered to his kin: he is not to enter the land that I have assigned to the Israelite people, because you disobeyed my command about the waters of Meribah." Moses took Aaron and his son Eleazar up on Mount Hor, and there he stripped Aaron of his vestments and put them on Eleazar, and Aaron died there. The Israelites mourned Aaron 30 days. The king of Arad engaged the Israelites in battle and took some of them captive. The Israelites vowed that if God gave them victory, they would destroy Arad. God delivered up the Canaanites, and the Israelites killed them and destroyed their cities, calling the place Hormah. But moving on, the people grew impatient, literally "short", and spoke against God and Moses, so God let loose serpents that killed many of the Israelites. The people came to Moses, admitted their sin by speaking against God, and asked Moses to intercede with God to take away the serpents, and Moses did so. God told Moses to mount a Nehushtan, or bronze serpent figure, on a pole, saying: "If anyone who is bitten looks at it, he shall recover."

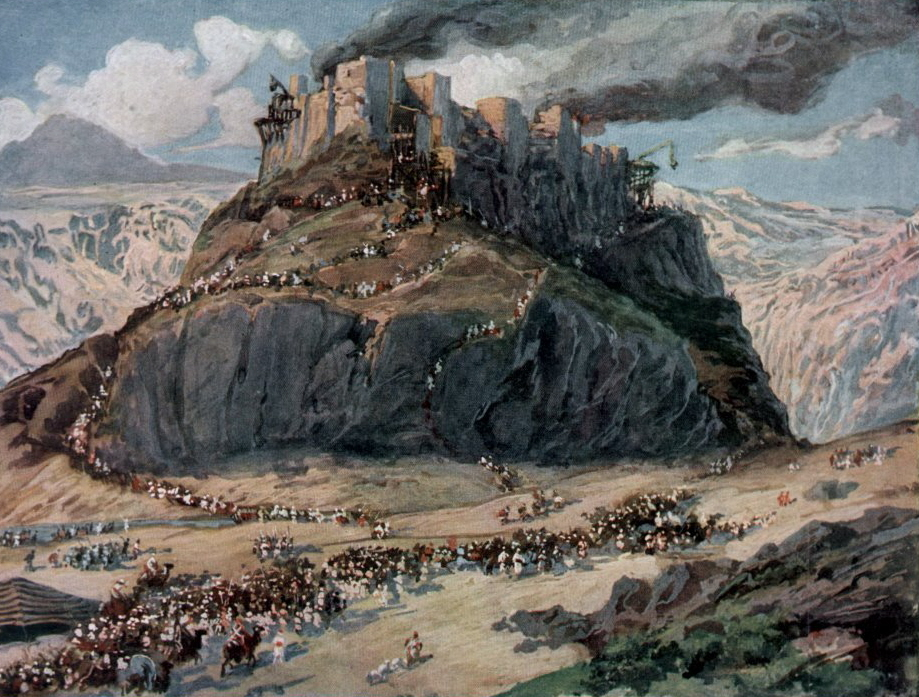
The Conquest of the Amorites (watercolor circa 1896–1902 by James Tissot)

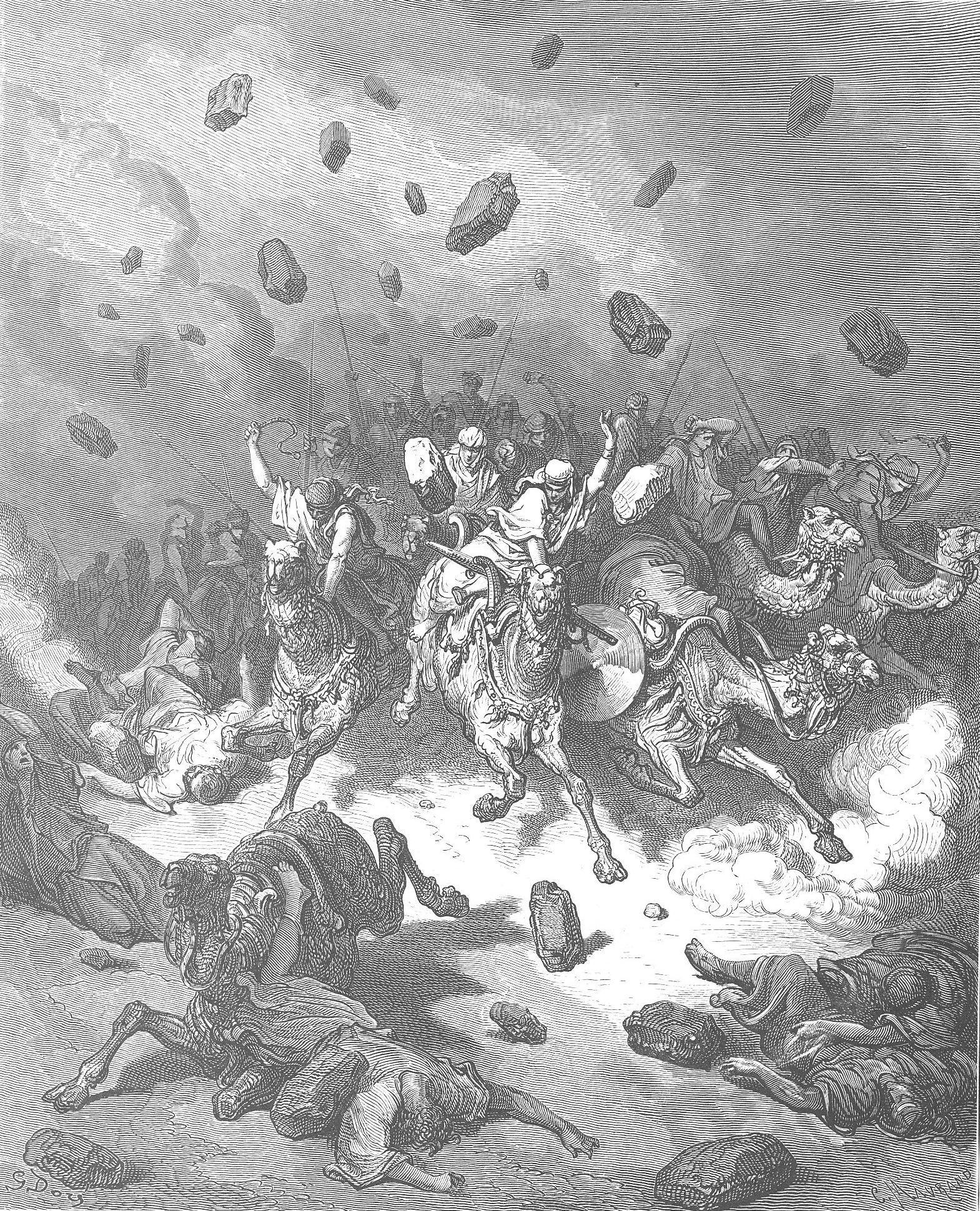
Destruction of the Army of the Amorites (engraving by Gustave Doré from the 1865 La Sainte Bible)

=== Sixth reading—Numbers 21:10–20 ===
In the sixth reading, the Israelites traveled on to Oboth, Ije-abarim, the valley of Zered (now Wadi al-Hasa), the other side of the Arnon (now Wadi Mujib), Be'er, Mattanah, Nahliel, Bamoth-Baal, and the field of Moab by the top of Mount Pisgah.

=== Seventh reading—Numbers 21:21–22:1 ===
In the seventh reading, the Israelites sent messengers to Sihon, king of the Amorites, asking that he allow them to pass through his country, without entering the fields or vineyards, and without drinking water from wells. But Sihon would not let Israel pass through his territory and engaged the Israelites in battle. The Israelites defeated the Amorites and took possession of their land and towns.

Then the Israelites marched on, and King Og of Bashan engaged them in battle. The Israelites defeated his forces and took possession of his country. The Israelites then marched to the steppes of Moab, across the Jordan River from Jericho.

=== Readings according to the triennial cycle ===
Jews who read the Torah according to the triennial cycle of Torah reading read the parashah according to a different schedule.

== In inner-biblical interpretation ==
The parashah has parallels or is discussed in these Biblical sources:

=== Numbers chapter 19 ===
==== Corpse contamination ====
The discussion of the Red Cow mixture for decontamination from corpse contamination in Numbers 19 is one of a series of passages in the Hebrew Bible setting out the teaching that contact with the dead is antithetical to purity.

In Leviticus 21:1–5, God instructed Moses to direct the priests not to allow themselves to become defiled by contact with the dead, except for a mother, father, son, daughter, brother, or unmarried sister. And the priests were not to engage in mourning rituals of making baldness upon their heads, shaving off the corners of their beards, or cutting their flesh.

In Numbers 5:1–4, God instructed Moses to command the Israelites to put out of the camp every person defiled by contact with the dead, so that they would not defile their camps, in the midst of which God dwelt.

Numbers 19 sets out a procedure for a Red Cow mixture for decontamination from corpse contamination.

In its profession associated with tithing, Deuteronomy 26:13–14 instructed Israelites to aver that they had not eaten from the tithe in mourning, nor put away any of it while unclean, nor given any of it to the dead.

In Ezekiel 43:6–9, the prophet Ezekiel cites the burial of kings within the Temple as one of the practices that defiled the Temple and cause God to abandon it.

In the Hebrew Bible, uncleanness has a variety of associations. Leviticus 11:8, 11; 21:1–4, 11; and Numbers 6:6–7; and 19:11–16; associate it with death. And perhaps similarly, Leviticus 12 associates it with childbirth, and Leviticus 13–14 associates it with skin disease. Leviticus 15 associates it with various sexuality-related events. And Jeremiah 2:7, 23; 3:2; and 7:30; and Hosea 6:10 associate it with contact with the worship of alien gods.

=== Numbers chapter 20 ===
An episode in the journey like Numbers 20:2–13 is recorded in Exodus 17:1–7, when the people complained of thirst and contended with God, Moses struck the rock with his rod to bring forth water, and the place was named Massah and Meribah. Psalms 81:7 and 95:8 recall Meribah: "I tested you at the waters of Meribah" and "Harden not your heart, as at Meribah, as in the day of Massah in the wilderness."

=== Numbers chapter 21 ===
The defeat of the Canaanites recorded at Hormah in Numbers 21:1–3 followed an earlier unsuccessful attempt to enter the Promised Land reported in Numbers 14:44–45, when the Amalekites and the Canaanites excluded the Israelites and pushed them back as far as Hormah. On two occasions, the Israelites proposed passage through territories without recourse to local resources (Numbers 20:17 and 21:22), and on one they proposed payment terms for use of local supplies (Numbers 20:19). When the Edomite King refused to allow passage, the Israelites took an alternate route (Numbers 20:21), whereas when the Amorite King refused them passage, they chose to press on anyway with the aid of 'the edge of the sword' (Numbers 21:23–24).

Numbers 21:24 reports that Israel put the Amorites to the sword and took possession of their land. Similarly, in Amos 2:9, the 8th century BCE prophet Amos announced that God said: "I destroyed the Amorite before them, whose stature was like the cedar's and who was stout as the oak, destroying his boughs above and his trunk below!"

== In early nonrabbinic interpretation ==
The parashah has parallels or is discussed in these early nonrabbinic sources: (Note: For more on early nonrabbinic interpretation, see, e.g., Esther Eshel, "Early Nonrabbinic Interpretation," in Adele Berlin and Marc Brettler, eds., Jewish Study Bible, 2nd ed., pp. 1841–59.)

=== Numbers chapter 19–20 ===
Josephus told that after having completed her fortieth year in the wilderness, Miriam died (as reported in Numbers 20:1). The Israelites staged an expensive public funeral for her and buried her on a mountain called Sin. After they had mourned for her 30 days, Moses purified the people by preparing the first mixture of the water of lustration prepared with the Red Cow described in Numbers 19.

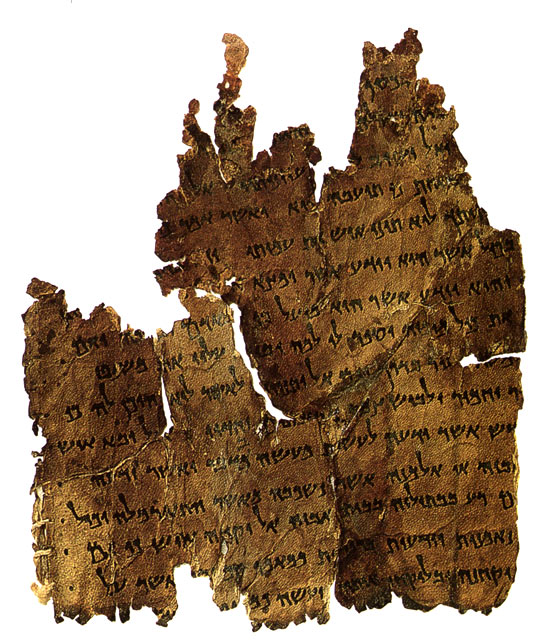
The Damascus Document

=== Numbers chapter 21 ===
Lawrence Schiffman noted that one of the Dead Sea Scrolls, the Damascus Document, contains a portion that has become known as the "Well Midrash," which interprets Numbers 21:18 to say, "A well which the officers have dug, which the notables of the people have dug…" The Damascus Document then interpreted the "well" to refer to the Torah, and interpreted those who dug it to be the returnees or penitents of Israel who left the Land of Judea to live in what they called the "Land of Damascus." Schiffman explained that the Damascus Document seems to refer to an exodus of the sectarians from Judea to the wilderness of Qumran, which they called "Damascus."

== In classical rabbinic interpretation ==
The parashah is discussed in these rabbinic sources from the era of the Mishnah and the Talmud:

=== Numbers chapter 19 ===
Reading Numbers 19:1, 20:12, and 20:23, in which God addresses both Moses and Aaron, a midrash taught that in 18 verses, Scripture places Moses and Aaron on an equal footing (as God spoke to both of them), and thus there are 18 benedictions in the Amidah prayer.

Rabbi Levi taught that God gave the section of the Red Cow in Numbers 19 (which came into force as soon as the Tabernacle was set up) on the day that the Israelites set up the Tabernacle. Joḥanan bar Nappaḥa said in the name of Rabbi Bana'ah that the Torah was transmitted in separate scrolls, as Psalm 40:8 says, "Then said I, 'Lo I am come, in the roll of the book it is written of me.'" Shimon ben Lakish (Resh Lakish), however, said that the Torah was transmitted in its entirety, as Deuteronomy 31:26, "Take this book of the law." The Gemara reported that Joḥanan interpreted Deuteronomy 31:26, "Take this book of the law," to refer to the time after the Torah had been joined from its several parts. And the Gemara suggested that Resh Lakish interpreted Psalm 40:8, "in a roll of the book written of me," to indicate that the whole Torah is called a "roll," as Zechariah 5:2 says, "And he said to me, 'What do you see?' And I answered, 'I see a flying roll.'" Or perhaps, the Gemara suggested, it is called "roll" for the reason given by Rabbi Levi, who said that God gave eight sections of the Torah, which Moses then wrote on separate rolls, on the day on which the Tabernacle was set up. They were: the section of the priests in Leviticus 21, the section of the Levites in Numbers 8:5–26 (as the Levites were required for the service of song on that day), the section of the unclean (who would be required to keep the Passover in the second month) in Numbers 9:1–14, the section of the sending of the unclean out of the camp (which also had to take place before the Tabernacle was set up) in Numbers 5:1–4, the section of Leviticus 16:1–34 (dealing with Yom Kippur, which Leviticus 16:1 states was transmitted immediately after the death of Aaron's two sons), the section dealing with the drinking of wine by priests in Leviticus 10:8–11, the section of the lights of the menorah in Numbers 8:1–4, and the section of the Red Cow in Numbers 19.

Tractate Parah in the Mishnah and Tosefta interpreted the laws of the Red Cow in Numbers 19:1–22.

Rabbi Tanḥum son of Rabbi Hannilai taught that Numbers 19 was one of two sections in the Torah (along with Leviticus 21, on corpse contamination) that Moses gave the Israelites in writing that are both pure, dealing with the law of purity. Rabbi Tanḥum taught that they were given on account of the tribe of Levi, of whom it is written (in Malachi 3:3), "he [God's messenger] shall purify the sons of Levi and purge them."

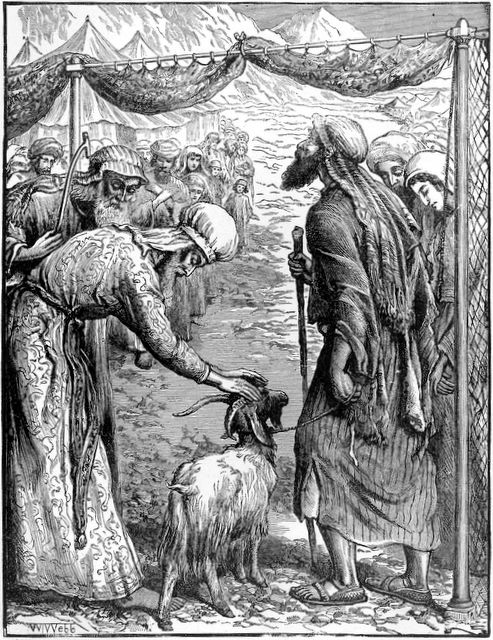
Sending Out the Scapegoat (illustration by William James Webb (1830–1904))

The Mishnah and Tosefta taught that if the month of Adar began on a Sabbath, then the section on the Red Cow in Numbers 19:1–22 was read on the third Sabbath of the month (thus preceding Passover, so as to caution the people to purify themselves in preparation for eating the Passover sacrifice).

Rabbi Joshua of Siknin taught in the name of Rabbi Levi that the Evil Inclination criticizes four laws as without logical basis. Scripture uses the expression "statute" (חֹק, chok) in connection with each: the laws of (1) a brother's wife (in Deuteronomy 25:5–10), (2) mingled kinds (in Leviticus 19:19 and Deuteronomy 22:11), (3) the scapegoat (in Leviticus 16), and (4) the Red Cow (in Numbers 19). In connection with the Red Cow, the Mishnah noted the paradox that the garments of all those who took any part in the preparation of the Red Cow became defiled, but the cow itself made garments ritually clean. And Numbers 19:1 applies the term "statute" to the Red Cow.

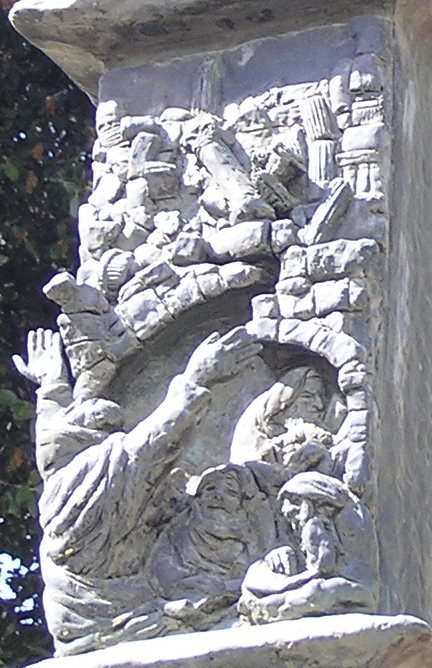
Yohanan ben Zakkai (detail from the Knesset Menorah in Jerusalem)

A midrash taught that an idolater once asked Yohanan ben Zakkai about the Red Cow, likening its procedures to witchcraft. Ben Zakkai asked the idolater what he had seen done for a man possessed by a demon of madness. The idolater explained how, in such a case, they would bring roots, make them smoke under the madman, sprinkle water on the man, and the demon would flee. Ben Zakkai told him that the Red Cow dealt similarly with the spirit of uncleanness, as Zechariah 13:2 says: "And also I will cause the prophets and the unclean spirit to pass out of the land." Ben Zakkai told him that when they sprinkled the water of purification on the unclean, the spirit of uncleanness fled. But when the idolater had gone, Ben Zakkai's disciples told him that they saw that he had put off the idolater with a mere makeshift and asked him what explanation he would give them. Ben Zakkai told his disciples that the dead did not defile nor the water purify; God had merely laid down a statute, issued a decree, and commanded that we not transgress the decree, as Numbers 19:2 says: "This is the statute of the law."

Expounding upon the commandment of the Red Cow in Numbers 19:2, Jose bar Ḥanina taught that God told Moses the reason for the commandment, but to everyone else, it would remain merely a statute.

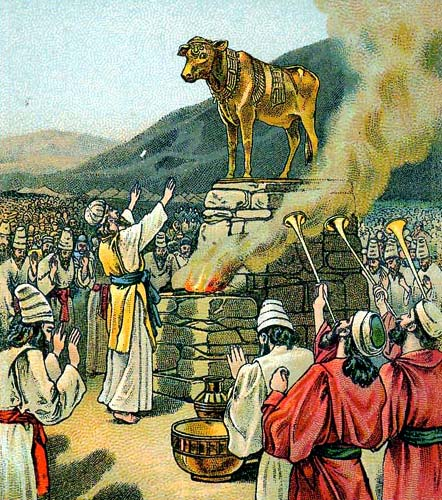
Worshiping the Golden Calf (illustration from a Bible card published 1901 by the Providence Lithograph Company)

Noting that Numbers 19:2, "This is the statute (חֻקַּת, ḥuqqaṯ) of the Law," uses the same term as Exodus 12:43, "This is the ordinance (חֻקַּת, chukat) of the Passover," a midrash found the statute of the Passover like the statute of the Red Heifer. The midrash taught that Psalm 119:80, "Let my heart be undivided in your statutes," refers to this similarity, and asked which statute is greater than the other. The midrash likened this to the case of two ladies who were walking side by side together apparently on an equal footing; who then is the greater? She whom her friend accompanies to her house and so is really being followed by the friend. The midrash concluded that the law of the Red Cow is the greater, for those who eat the Passover need the Red Cow's purifying ashes, as Numbers 19:17 says, "And for the unclean they shall take of the ashes of the burning of the purification from sin."

All other communal sacrifices were of male animals, but the Red Cow was of a female animal. Rabbi Aibu explained the difference with a parable: When a handmaiden's boy polluted a king's palace, the king called on the boy's mother to clear away the filth. In the same way, God called on the Red Cow to come and atone for the incident of the Golden Calf.

A midrash taught that when God so pleased, God called for atonement for the Golden Calf through a female agent, as in Numbers 19:2, "That they bring you a red heifer (פָרָה, pārā), faultless, wherein is no blemish . . . ," and when God so pleased, God called for that atonement through a male agent, as in Exodus 29:1, with regard to the investiture of the Priests, "Take one young bullock (פַּר, par)."

Rabbi Eliezer ruled that the calf (עֶגְלָה, eglā) prescribed in Deuteronomy 21:3–6 whose neck would be broken had to be no more than one year old and the Red Cow prescribed in Numbers 19:2 had to be two years old. But the Sages ruled that the calf could be even two years old, and the Red Cow could be three or four years old. Rabbi Meir ruled that the Red Cow could be even five years old, but they did not wait with an older cow, as it might in the meantime grow some black hairs and thus become invalid. The Gemara further distinguished the Red Cow from the calf whose neck would be broken by noting that in the case of the Red Cow, Numbers 19:2 states: "Wherein (בָּהּ, bāh) is no blemish". The Gemara reasoned that this teaches that it was only concerning it (בָּהּ, bāh) that a blemish disqualified, but a blemish did not disqualify concerning the calf whose neck would be broken. The Gemara also noted that as both Numbers 19:2, with regard to the Red Cow, and Deuteronomy 21:3, with regard to the calf whose neck would be broken, use the word "yoke". The Gemara deduced from this common terminology that just as with regard to the calf whose neck would be broken, other types of labor would disqualify it, so too with regard to the Red Cow, other types of labor would disqualify it.

Rabbi Eliezer ruled that a Red Cow that was pregnant was nonetheless valid, but the Sages ruled it invalid. Rabbi Eliezer ruled that the Red Cow could not be purchased from Gentiles, but the Sages ruled that such cow could be valid.

If the horns or the hoofs of the Red Cow were black, they were chopped off, and the Red Cow was then valid. The cow's eye, teeth, and tongue could cause no invalidity. And a dwarf-like cow was nonetheless valid. If the Red Cow had a sebaceous cyst and they cut it off, Judah ben Ilai ruled the cow invalid, but Rabbi Simeon ruled it invalid only if no red hair grew in its place.

A Red Cow born by a caesarean section, the hire of a harlot, or the price of a dog was invalid. Rabbi Eliezer ruled it valid, for Deuteronomy 23:19 states, "You shall not bring the hire of a harlot or the price of a dog into the house of the Lord your God," the Red Cow was not brought into the Temple. The Mishnah taught that all blemishes that caused consecrated animals to be invalid as sacrifices also caused the Red Cow to be invalid. If one had ridden on the cow, leaned on it, hung on its tail, crossed a river with its help, doubled up its leading rope, or put one's cloak on it, the cow was invalid. But if one had only fastened it by its leading rope or made for it a sandal to prevent it from slipping, or spread one's cloak on it because of flies, it remained valid. The general rule was that wherever one did something for its own sake, the cow remained valid; but if one did something for the sake of another purpose, it invalidated the cow. If a bird rested on the cow, it remained valid. If a bull mounted it, it became invalid, but Rabbi Judah ruled that if people brought the bull to mate with the cow, the cow became invalid, but if the bull did so on its own, the cow remained valid.

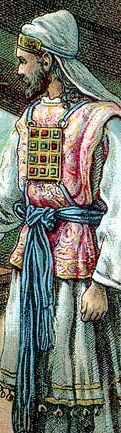
The High Priest Wearing His Jeweled Breastplate over His Ephod (detail from an illustration from a Bible card published 1907 by the Providence Lithograph Company)

If a cow had two black or white hairs growing within one follicle, it was invalid. Rabbi Judah said even within one hollow. If the hairs grew within two adjacent follicles, the cow was invalid. Rabbi Akiva ruled that even if there were four or even five non-red hairs, if they were dispersed, they could be plucked out. Rabbi Eliezer ruled that even as many as 50 such hairs could be plucked. But Rabbi Joshua ben Bathyra ruled that even if it had only one non-red hair on its head and one on its tail, it was invalid. If the cow had two hairs in one follicle with their roots black and their tips red or with their roots red and their tips black, Rabbi Meir taught that what was visible determined validity; but the Sages ruled that validity followed the root.

Rav Judah reported in Samuel's name an account of the rarity of completely Red Cows: When they asked Rabbi Eliezer how far the honor due parents extended, Rabbi Eliezer told of a non-Jew from Ashkelon named Dama, son of Nethinah. The Sages offered Dama a profit of 600,000 gold denarii (or Rav Kahana said 800,000 denarii) in exchange for jewels that he had that the Sages could use in the ephod. As the key to the jewels lay under Dama's father's pillow, Dama declined the offer so as not to trouble his father. The next year, God rewarded Dama by causing a Red Cow to be born in his herd. When the Sages went to buy it, Dama told them that he knew that he could ask for all the money in the world and they would pay it, but he asked for only the money that he had lost in honoring his father.

Rabbi Eliezer noted that both Leviticus 16:27 (regarding burning the Yom Kippur sin offerings) and Numbers 19:3 (concerning slaughtering the Red Cow) say "outside the camp." Rabbi Eliezer concluded that both actions had to be conducted outside the three camps of the Israelites, and in the time of the Temple in Jerusalem, both actions had to be conducted to the east of Jerusalem.

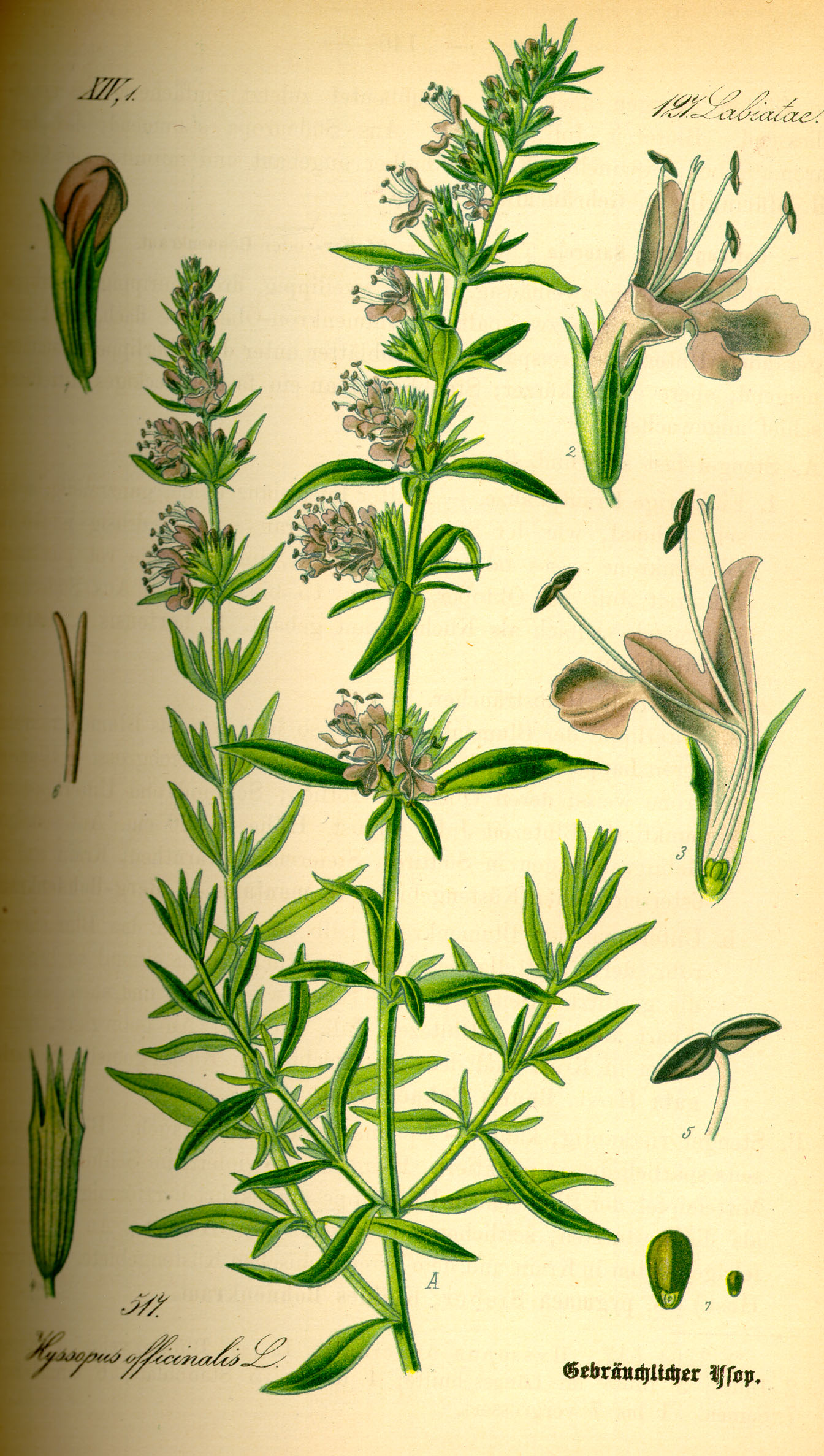
hyssop (1885 painting by Otto Wilhelm Thomé)

Rabbi Isaac contrasted the Red Cow in Numbers 19:3–4 and the bull that the High Priest of Israel brought for himself on Yom Kippur in Leviticus 16:3–6. Rabbi Isaac taught that a lay Israelite could slaughter one of the two, but not the other, but Rabbi Isaac did not know which was which. The Gemara reported that Rav and Samuel disagreed about the answer. Rav held it invalid for a lay Israelite to slaughter the Red Cow and valid for a lay Israelite to slaughter the High Priest's bull. In contrast, Samuel held it invalid for a lay Israelite to slaughter the High Priest's bull and valid for a lay Israelite to slaughter the Red Cow. The Gemara reported that Rav Zeira (or some say Rav Zeira in the name of Rav) said that the slaughtering of the Red Cow by a lay Israelite was invalid. Rav deduced from this statement the importance that Numbers 19:3 specifies "Eleazar" and Numbers 19:2 specifies that the law of the Red Cow is a "statute" (and thus required precise execution). But the Gemara challenged Rav's conclusion that the use of the terms "Eleazar" and "statute" in Numbers 19:2–3 in connection with the Red Cow decided the matter, for in connection with the High Priest's bull, Leviticus 16:3 specifies "Aaron," and Leviticus 16:34 calls the law of Leviticus 16 a "statute," as well. The Gemara supposed that the characterization of Leviticus 16:34 of the law as a "statute" might apply to only the Temple services described in Leviticus 16, and the slaughtering of the High Priest's bull might be regarded as not a Temple service. But the Gemara asked whether the same logic might apply to the Red Cow, as well, as it was not a Temple service, either. The Gemara posited that one might consider the Red Cow to have been an offering for Temple upkeep. Rav Shisha son of Rav Idi taught that the Red Cow was like the inspection of skin diseases in Leviticus 13–14, which was not a Temple service, yet required a priest's participation. The Gemara then turned to Samuel's position, that a lay Israelite could kill the Red Cow. Samuel interpreted the words "and he shall slay it before him" in Numbers 19:3 to mean that a lay Israelite could slaughter the cow as Eleazar watched. The Gemara taught that Rav, on the other hand, explained the words "and he shall slay it before him" in Numbers 19:3 to enjoin Eleazar not to divert his attention from the slaughter of the Red Cow. The Gemara reasoned that Samuel deduced that Eleazer must not divert his attention from the words "and the cow shall be burnt in his sight" in Numbers 19:5 (which one could similarly read to imply an injunction for Eleazar to pay close attention). And Rav explained the words "in his sight" in one place to refer to the slaughtering, and in the other to the burning, and the law enjoined his attention to both. In contrast, the Gemara posited that Eleazar might not have needed to pay close attention to the casting in of cedar wood, hyssop, and scarlet, because they were not part of the Red Cow itself.

Ulla interpreted the words "and he shall bring it forth" in Numbers 19:3 to teach that he could not bring forth another cow with the Red Cow. As the Mishnah taught, if the Red Cow refused to go forth, one could not send a black cow with the Red Cow, lest people say that they slaughtered a black cow, nor could two Red Cows be brought forth together, lest people say that they slaughtered two. Rabbi (or others say Rabbi Jose) taught that a second cow was not to be taken out because Numbers 19:3 says, "and he shall bring it forth" and "it" implies by itself. The Gemara taught that the teaching of the Mishnah and Rabbi differed in the case of whether one could bring forth a donkey with the Red Cow. (According to the Mishnah, that would be permitted because the presence of the donkey would not mislead people that they were sacrificing the donkey, but according to Rabbi, it would be forbidden, for "it" excludes permission for any other animal to be brought forth together with the Red Cow.)

Ulla interpreted the words "And he shall slay it" in Numbers 19:3 to teach that one could not slaughter any other one with it.

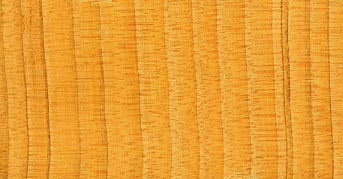
cedar wood

A midrash noted that God commanded the Israelites to perform certain precepts with similar material from trees: God commanded that the Israelites throw cedar wood and hyssop into the Red Cow mixture of Numbers 19:6 and use hyssop to sprinkle the resulting waters of lustration in Numbers 19:18; God commanded that the Israelites use cedar wood and hyssop to purify those stricken with skin disease in Leviticus 14:4–6; and in Egypt God commanded the Israelites to use the bunch of hyssop to strike the lintel and the two side-posts with blood in Exodus 12:22. Noting that the cedar was among the tallest of tall trees and the hyssop was among the lowest of low plants, the midrash associated the cedar with arrogance and the hyssop with humility. The midrash noted that many things appear lowly, but God commanded many precepts to be performed with them. The hyssop, for instance, appears to be of no worth to people, yet its power is great in the eyes of God, who put it on a level with cedar in the purification of the leper in Leviticus 14:4–6 and the burning of the Red Cow in Numbers 19:6, 18, and employed it in the Exodus from Egypt in Exodus 12:22.

Rabbi Isaac noted two red threads, one in connection with the Red Cow in Numbers 19:6, and the other in connection with the scapegoat in the Yom Kippur service of Leviticus 16:7–10 (which Mishnah Yoma 4:2 indicates was marked with a red thread). Rabbi Isaac had heard that one required a definite size, while the other did not, but he did not know which was which. Rav Joseph reasoned that because (as Mishnah Yoma 6:6 explains) the red thread of the scapegoat was divided, that thread required a definite size, whereas that of the Red Cow, which did not need to be divided, did not require a definite size. Rami bar Ḥama objected that the thread of the Red Cow required a certain weight (to be cast into the flames, as described in Numbers 19:6). Rava said that the matter of this weight was disputed by Tannaim (as explained below). Abaye objected (based on Mishnah Parah) that they wrapped the red thread together with the cedar wood and hyssop. Rav Ḥanin said in the name of Rav that if the cedar wood and the red thread were merely caught by the flame, they were used validly. They objected to Rav Ḥanin based on a baraita which taught that if the thread caught fire in midair, they brought another thread to prepare the water of lustration. Abaye reconciled the two opinions by interpreting the baraita to speak of a flame that blazed high above the cow, and interpreting Rav Ḥanin to speak of a subdued flame that consumed the thread near the burning cow. Rava explained the dispute among Tannaim about the weight of the red thread in connection with the Red Cow. Rabbi taught that they wrapped the cedar wood and hyssop together with the red thread so that they formed one bunch. Rabbi Eleazar the son of Rabbi Simeon said that they wrapped them together so that they had sufficient weight to fall into the midst of the burning cow.

When Rav Dimi came from the Land of Israel, he said in the name of Rabbi Joḥanan that there were three red threads: one in connection with the Red Cow, the second in connection with the scapegoat, and the third in connection with the person with skin disease (the מְּצֹרָע, m'tzora) in Leviticus 14:4. Rav Dimi reported that one weighed ten zuz, another weighed two selas, and the third weighed a shekel, but he could not say which was which. When Rabin came, he said in the name of Rabbi Jonathan that the thread in connection with the Red Cow weighed ten zuz, that of the scapegoat weighed two selas, and that of the person with skin disease weighed a shekel. Rabbi Joḥanan said that Rabbi Simeon ben Ḥalafta and the Sages disagreed about the thread of the Red Cow, one saying that it weighed ten shekels, the other that it weighed one shekel. Rabbi Jeremiah of Difti said to Ravina that they disagreed not about the thread of the Red Cow, but about that of the scapegoat.

The Mishnah taught that seven days before the burning of the Red Cow, they removed the priest who was to burn the cow from his house to a room called the stone chamber facing the north-eastern corner of the Temple. The Mishnah taught that throughout the seven days, they sprinkled on the priest a mixture of all the sin-offerings that were there, but Rabbi Jose taught that they sprinkled only on the third and the seventh days. And Rabbi Ḥanina, the Deputy High Priest, taught that on the priest who was to burn the cow, they sprinkled all the seven days, but on the one who was to perform the service on Yom Kippur, they sprinkled only on the third and the seventh days.

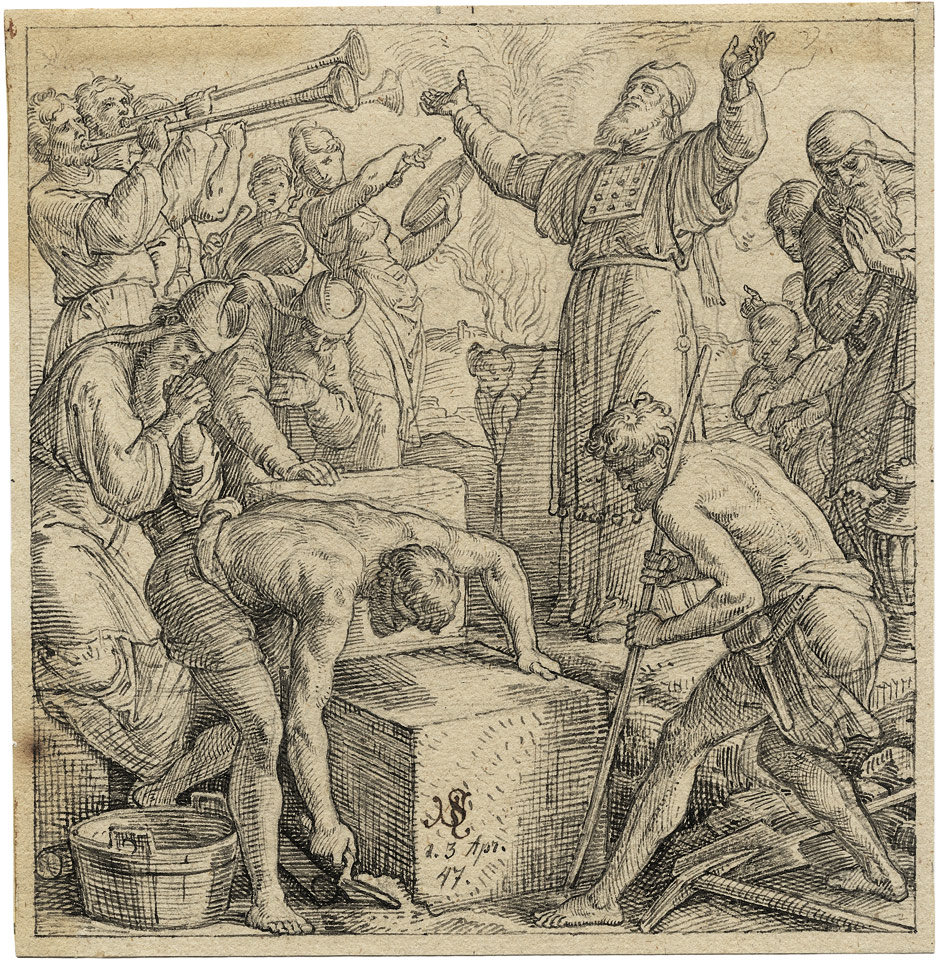
The rebuilding of the Temple in Jerusalem under Ezra and Nehemiah (1847 drawing by Julius Schnorr von Carolsfeld')

To protect against defilement from contact with the dead, they built courtyards over bedrock, and left beneath them a hollow to serve as protection against a grave in the depths. They used to bring pregnant women there to give birth and rear their children in this ritually pure place. They placed doors on the backs of oxen and placed the children upon them with stone cups in their hands. When the children reached the pool of Siloam, the children stepped down, filled the cups with water, and then climbed back up on the doors. Rabbi Jose said that each child used to let down his cup and fill it from on top of the oxen. When the children arrived at the Temple Mount with the water, they got down. Beneath the Temple Mount and the Temple courtyards was a hollow, which protected against contamination from a grave in the depths. At the entrance of the court of the women, they kept a jar of the ashes of the sin-offerings. If they did not find the residue of the ashes of seven Red Cows, they performed the sprinkling with those of six, of five, of four, of three, of two or of one. They made a causeway from the Temple Mount to the Mount of Olives, arches above arches, each arch placed directly above each pier of the arch below, as a protection against a grave in the depths, on which the priest who was to burn the cow, the cow itself, and all who aided in its preparation went forth to the Mount of Olives. If the cow refused to go out, they did not take out with it a black cow, lest it be said that they killed a black cow instead of a Red Cow. Nor did they bring out another Red Cow, lest it be said that they killed two Red Cows. But Rabbi Jose said it was not for this reason, but because Numbers 19:3 says, "And he shall bring her forth," implying: by herself.

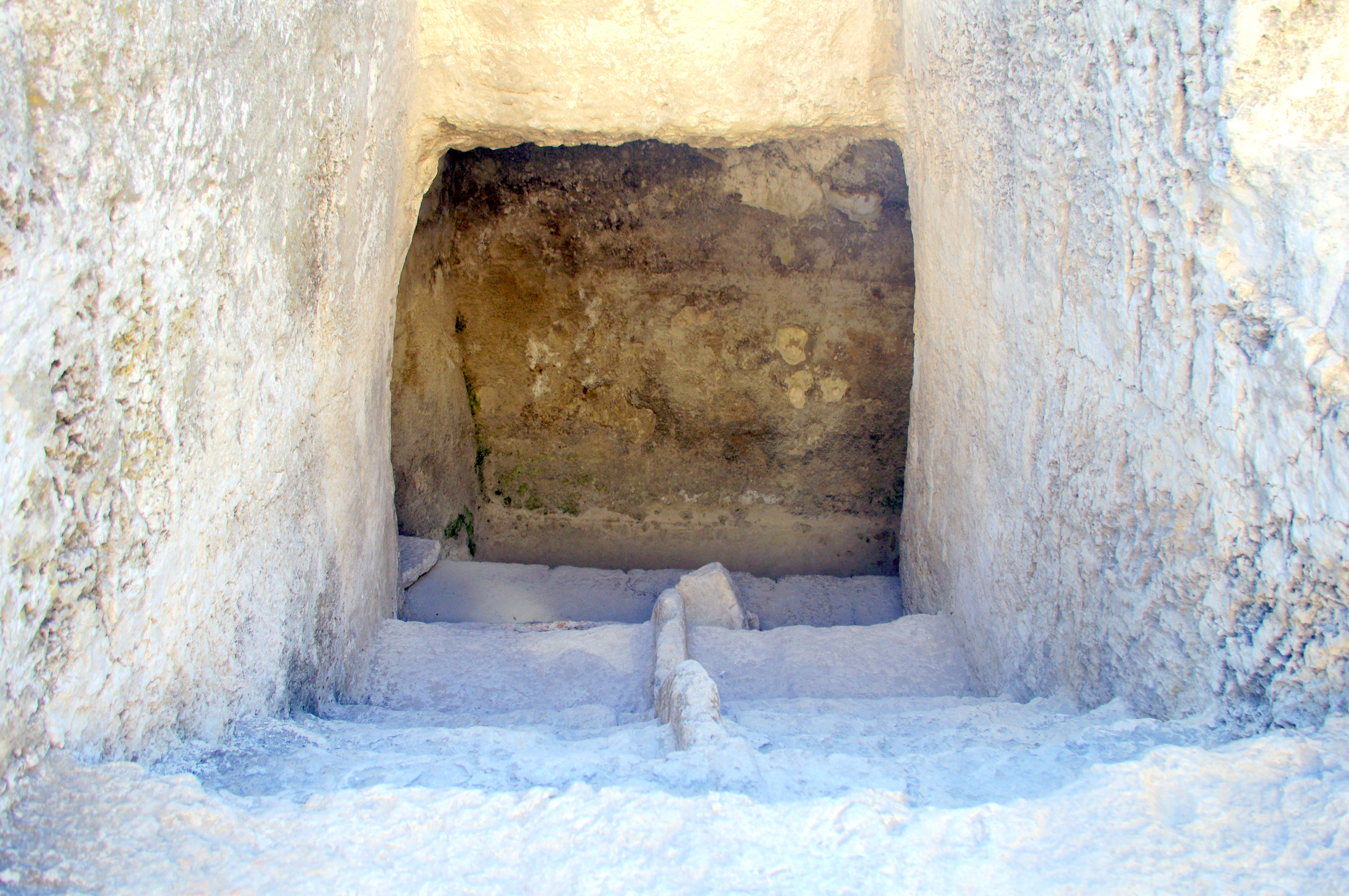
An Ancient Mikveh on the Temple Mount in Jerusalem

The elders of Israel used to precede them on foot to the Mount of Olives, where there was a place of immersion. The priest who was to burn the cow was deliberately made unclean in contravention of the teaching of the Sadducees, who taught that the cow needed to be slaughtered by one on whom the sun had set after cleansing from his impurity. They laid their hands upon the priest and said, "My lord High Priest, immerse once." He then immersed himself, came up, and dried himself. They laid out different kinds of wood there—cedar wood, pine, spruce, and the wood of smooth fig trees. They built up the pile of wood in the shape of a tower furnished with air holes, and they turned its foreside towards the west.

Map of Jerusalem in 70 CE; the Temple of Jerusalem in yellow; the old city in light blue; the new city in dark blue; and the Mount of Olives in light orange directly to the east of the Temple (2008 map by TcfkaPanairjdde)

The Mishnah taught that they bound the Red Cow with a bast rope and placed it on the pile with its head towards the south and its face towards the west. The priest stood on the east side facing west. He slaughtered the cow with his right hand and received the blood with his left hand. But Rabbi Judah said that he received the blood with his right hand, put it on his left hand, and then sprinkled with his right hand. He dipped his finger in the blood and sprinkled it towards the Holy of Holies seven times, dipping once for each sprinkling.

The Mishnah taught that during the time of the Temple in Jerusalem, all the walls of the Temple were high except the eastern wall. This was so that the priest who burned the Red Cow, while standing on the top of the Mount of Olives, might see the door of the main Temple building when he sprinkled the blood.

The Mishnah also taught that in the time of the Temple, there were five gates to the Temple Mount. The Eastern Gate was decorated with a picture of Shushan, the capital of Persia, and through that gate the High Priest would burn the Red Cow and all those attending to it would exit to the Mount of Olives.

The Mishnah taught that when the priest had finished the sprinkling, he wiped his hand on the body of the cow, climbed down, and kindled the fire with wood chips. But Rabbi Akiva said that he kindled the fire with dry branches of palm trees. When the cow's carcass burst in the fire, the priest took up a position outside the pit, took hold of the cedar wood, hyssop, and scarlet wool, and said to the observers: "Is this cedar wood? Is this hyssop? Is this scarlet wool?" He repeated each question three times, and the observers answered "Yes" three times to each question. The priest then wrapped the cedar wood, hyssop, and scarlet wool together with the ends of the wool and cast them into the burning pyre. When the fire burned out, they beat the ashes with rods and then sifted them with sieves. They then divided the ashes into three parts: One part was deposited on the rampart, one on the Mount of Olives, and one was divided among the courses of priests who performed the Temple services in turn.

The Mishnah taught that the funding for the Red Cow came out of the appropriation of the chamber. The ramp for the Red Cow came out of the remainder in the chamber. Abba Saul said that the high priests paid for the ramp out of their own funds.

Rabbi Meir taught that Moses prepared the first Red Cow ashes, Ezra prepared the second, and five were prepared since then. But the Sages taught that seven were prepared since Ezra. They said that Simeon the Just and Joḥanan the High Priest prepared two each, and Eliehoenai the son of Hakof, Hanamel the Egyptian, and Ishmael the son of Piabi each prepared one.

Reading Numbers 19:9, "And it [the mixture of ash and water] shall be kept for the congregation of the children of Israel," the Pesikta de-Rav Kahana taught that in this world priests used the water of the Red Cow to make things ritually clean or unclean, but in the World To Come, God will purify Israel, as Ezekiel 36:25 says, "I will sprinkle clean water upon you, and you shall be clean; from all your uncleannesses, and from all your idols, I cleanse you."

Reading Numbers 19:8, the Mishnah noted that the person who burned the Red Cow (as well as the person who burned the bulls burned pursuant to Leviticus 4:3–21 or 16:27 and the person who led away the scapegoat pursuant to Leviticus 16:7–10 and 26) rendered unclean the clothes worn while so doing. But the Red Cow (as well as the bull and the scapegoat) did not itself render unclean clothes with which it came in contact. The Mishnah imagined the clothing saying to the person: "Those that render you unclean do not render me unclean, but you render me unclean."

Tractate Oholot in the Mishnah and Tosefta interpreted the laws of corpse contamination in Numbers 19:11–16. Rabbi Eleazar ben Azariah counseled Rabbi Akiva to stop studying Aggadah (the homiletic exegetical texts of classical rabbinic literature) and turn instead to the complicated laws concerning impurity through skin disease (in Tractate Negaim) and corpse contamination (in Tractate Oholot).

The Mishnah taught that there are cases where two things can be rendered impure in succession by a corpse, one of those things being rendered impure with a seven-day impurity and the other thing being rendered impure with an impurity lasting until the evening. There are cases where three things can be rendered impure in succession by a corpse, two of those things being rendered impure with a seven-day impurity and the remaining thing with an impurity lasting until the evening. And there are cases where four things can be rendered impure in succession by a corpse, three of those things being rendered impure with a seven-day impurity and the remaining thing with an impurity lasting until the evening.

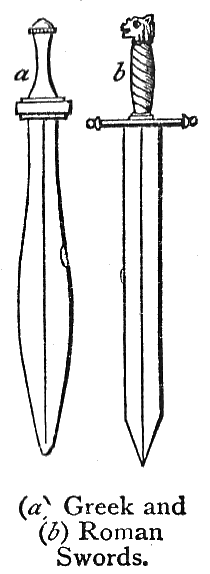
Ancient Greek and Roman Swords (1908 illustration from Chambers's Twentieth Century Dictionary of the English Language)

The Mishnah taught that a case of corpse contamination of two things in succession (where one is rendered impure with a seven-day impurity and one being rendered impure with an impurity until the evening) occurs when a person who touches a corpse is rendered impure with a seven-day impurity, as Numbers 19:11 says, "He who touches the corpse of any human being shall be unclean for seven days." The Rabbis considered a corpse to have the highest power to defile and regarded a corpse as an originating source of impurity, a "father of fathers of impurity" (אבי אבות הטומאה, avi avot ha-tumah). Thus, the Mishnah taught that a corpse can confer a generating impurity, a "father of impurity" (אב הטומאה, av ha-tumah), on a person with whom it comes in contact. A "father of impurity" (אב הטומאה, av ha-tumah) requires a seven-day cleansing period. And then a second person who touches the first person who touched the corpse is rendered impure with an impurity lasting until the evening, as Numbers 19:22 says, "the person who touches him shall be unclean until evening." The "father of impurity" (אב הטומאה, av ha-tumah)—in this case, the person who first touched the corpse—can, in turn, confer a first-grade impurity (ראשון לטומאה, rishon l'tumah), which requires a cleansing period lasting only until sundown. In sum, in this case, the first person acquired a "father of impurity" (אב הטומאה, av ha-tumah) from the corpse, and the second person acquired a first-grade impurity (ראשון לטומאה, rishon l'tumah) from the first person.

Resh Lakish derived from Numbers 19:14, "This is the Torah, when a man shall die in the tent," that words of Torah are firmly held by one who kills himself for Torah study.

The Mishnah taught that a case of corpse contamination of three things in succession (where two are rendered impure with seven-day impurity and one with an impurity until the evening) occurs when a utensil touching a corpse becomes a "father of fathers of impurity" (אבי אבות הטומאה, avi avot ha-tumah) like the corpse, as Numbers 19:16 says, "whoever in the open field touches one that is slain with a sword, or one that died . . . shall be impure seven days," and from the words "slain with a sword," the Rabbis deduced that "a sword is like the one slain" (חרב הרי הוא כחלל, cherev harei hu kechalal), and thus a utensil that touches a corpse is a "father of fathers of impurity" (אבי אבות הטומאה, avi avot ha-tumah) like the corpse. And another utensil touching this first utensil is rendered impure—a "father of impurity" (אב הטומאה, av ha-tumah)—and both utensils acquire a seven-day impurity. But the third thing in this series, whether a person or a utensil, is then rendered impure with an impurity lasting until the evening—a first-grade impurity (ראשון לטומאה, rishon l'tumah).

And the Mishnah taught that a case of corpse contamination of four things in succession (where three are rendered impure with seven-day impurity and one with impurity until the evening) occurs when a utensil touching a corpse is rendered a "father of fathers of impurity" (אבי אבות הטומאה, avi avot ha-tumah) like the corpse, a person touching these utensils is rendered a "father of impurity" (אב הטומאה, av ha-tumah), and another utensil touching this person is rendered impure with a seven-day impurity—a "father of impurity" (אב הטומאה, av ha-tumah)—as the Rabbis read Numbers 31:24, "And you shall wash your clothes on the seventh day, and you shall be clean," to teach that persons who have touched a corpse convey seven-day impurity to utensils. The fourth thing in this series, whether a person or a utensil, is then rendered impure with an impurity lasting until the evening—a first-grade impurity (ראשון לטומאה, rishon l'tumah).

The Mishnah taught that there are 248 parts in a human body, and each one of these parts can render impure by contact, carrying, or being under the same roof when they have upon them flesh sufficient that they could heal if still connected to a living person. But if they do not have sufficient flesh upon them, these individual parts can render impure only by contact and carrying but cannot render impure by being under the same roof (although a mostly intact corpse does).

Ulla taught that the Rabbis ruled the skin of dead people contaminating so as to prevent people from fashioning their parents' skin into keepsakes. Similarly, the Mishnah taught that the Sadducees mocked the Pharisees, because the Pharisees taught that the Holy Scrolls rendered unclean the hands that touched them, but the books of Homer did not. In response, Rabban Joḥanan ben Zakai noted that both the Pharisees and the Sadducees taught that a donkey's bones were clean, yet the bones of Joḥanan the High Priest were unclean. The Sadducees replied to Rabban Joḥanan that the uncleanness of human bones flowed from the love for them, so that people should not make keepsakes out of their parents' bones. Rabban Joḥanan replied that the same was true of the Holy Scriptures, for their uncleanness flowed from the love for them. Homer's books, which were not as precious, thus did not render unclean the hands that touched them.

Rabbi Akiva interpreted the words "and the clean person shall sprinkle upon the unclean" in Numbers 19:19 to teach that if the sprinkler sprinkled upon an unclean person, the person became clean, but if he sprinkled upon a clean person, the person became unclean. The Gemara explained that Rabbi Akiva's view hinged on the superfluous words "upon the unclean," which must have been put in Numbers 19:19 to teach this. But the Sages held that these effects of sprinkling applied only in the case of things that were susceptible to uncleanness. The Gemara explained that the Rabbis' view could be deduced from the logical proposition that the greater includes the lesser: If sprinkling upon the unclean makes clean, how much more so should sprinkling upon the clean keep clean or make cleaner? And the Gemara said that it is with reference to Rabbi Akiva's position that Solomon said in Ecclesiastes 7:23: "I said, 'I will get wisdom,' but it is far from me." That is, even Solomon could not explain it.

Rabbi Joshua ben Kebusai taught that all his days he had read the words "and the clean person shall sprinkle upon the unclean" in Numbers 19:19 and only discovered its meaning from the storehouse of Yavneh. And from the storehouse of Yavneh Rabbi Joshua ben Kebusai learned that one clean person could sprinkle even a hundred unclean persons.

The Jerusalem Talmud cited Numbers 19:19, "the pure one sprinkles on the impure one on the third day," for the proposition that sprinkling of the water of lustration had to be done during the daytime.

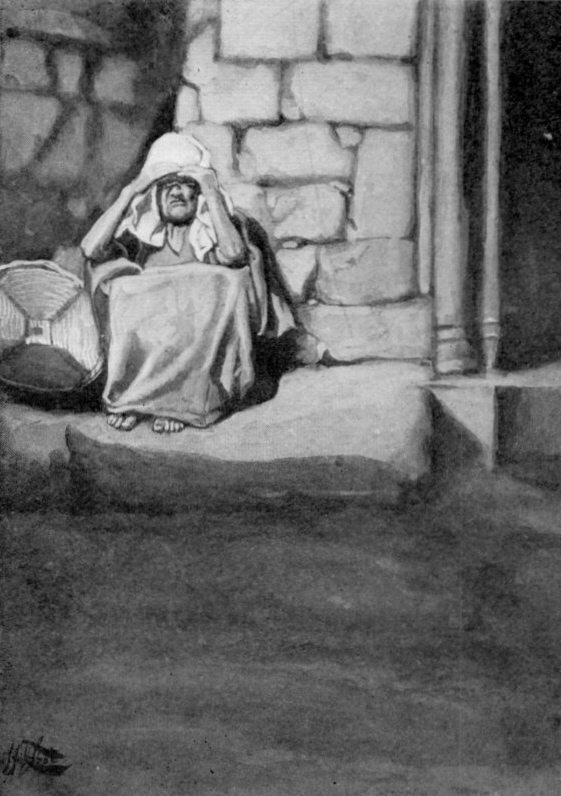
Miriam (watercolor circa 1896–1902 by James Tissot)

=== Numbers chapter 20 ===
Rabbi Ammi taught that the Torah places the account of Miriam's death in Numbers 20:1 immediately after the laws of the Red Cow in Numbers 19:1–22 to teach that even as the Red Cow provided atonement, so the death of the righteous provides atonement for those whom they leave behind.

Rabbi Eleazar taught that Miriam died with a Divine kiss, just as Moses would. As Deuteronomy 34:5 says, "So Moses the servant of the Lord died there in the land of Moab by the mouth of the Lord," and Numbers 20:1 says, "And Miriam died there"—both using the word "there"—Rabbi Eleazar deduced that both Moses and Miriam died the same way. Rabbi Eleazar explained that Numbers 20:1 does not say that Miriam died "by the mouth of the Lord" because it would be indelicate to say so.

Similarly, the Sages taught that there were six people over whom the Angel of Death had no sway in their demise—Abraham, Isaac, and Jacob, Moses, Aaron, and Miriam. Abraham, Isaac, and Jacob, as it is written with regard to them, respectively: "with everything," "from everything," "everything"; since they were blessed with everything, they were certainly spared the anguish of the Angel of Death. Moses, Aaron, and Miriam, as Numbers 33:38 and Deuteronomy 34:5 says with regard to them that they died "by the mouth of the Lord," which indicates that they died with a kiss, and not at the hand of the Angel of Death. And the Sages taught that there were seven people over whom the worm and the maggot had no sway—Abraham, Isaac, Jacob, Moses, Aaron, Miriam, and Benjamin. Abraham, Isaac, and Jacob, as it is written regarding them, respectively: "with everything," "from everything," and "everything." Moses, Aaron, and Miriam, as it is written with regard to them: "By the mouth of the Lord."

Rabbi Jose the son of Rabbi Judah taught that three good leaders arose for Israel—Moses, Aaron, and Miriam—and for their sake Providence conferred three good things on Israel—the well that accompanied the Israelites on their journeys for the merit of Miriam, the pillar of cloud for the merit of Aaron, and the manna for the merit of Moses. When Miriam died, the well disappeared, as Numbers 20:1 reports, "And Miriam died there," and immediately thereafter Numbers 20:2 reports, "And there was no water for the congregation." The well returned for the merit of Moses and Aaron. When Moses died, the well, the pillar of cloud, and the manna all disappeared, as Zechariah 11:8 reports, "And I cut off the three shepherds in one month."

Similarly, a midrash taught that when the righteous are born, nobody feels the difference, but when they die, everybody feels it. When Miriam was born, nobody felt it, but when she died (as reported in Numbers 20:1), the well ceased to exist and all felt her loss. The well made her death known. When Aaron was born, nobody felt it, but when he died and the clouds of glory departed, all felt his loss. The cloud thus made his death known. And when Moses was born, nobody felt it, but when he died, all felt it, because the manna made his death known by ceasing to fall.

The Gemara employed Numbers 20:1 to deduce that one may not benefit from a corpse. The Gemara deduced this conclusion from the use of the same word "there" (שָׁם, sham) both in connection with the cow whose neck was to be broken (הָעֶגְלָה, הָעֲרוּפָה, ha-eglah ha-arufah) prescribed in Deuteronomy 21:3–6 and here in Numbers 20:1 in connection with a corpse. Numbers 20:1 says, "And Miriam died there (שָׁם, sham)," and Deuteronomy 21:4 says, "And they shall break the cow's neck there (שָׁם, sham) in the valley." Just as one was prohibited to benefit from the cow, so also one was thus prohibited to benefit from a corpse. And the School of Rabbi Yannai taught that one was prohibited to benefit from the cow because Deuteronomy 21:8 mentions forgiveness (כַּפֵּר, kaper) in connection with the cow, just as atonement (כַּפֵּר, kaper) is mentioned in connection with sacrifices (for example in Exodus 29:36). (Just as one was prohibited to benefit from sacrifices, so also one was thus prohibited to benefit from the cow.)

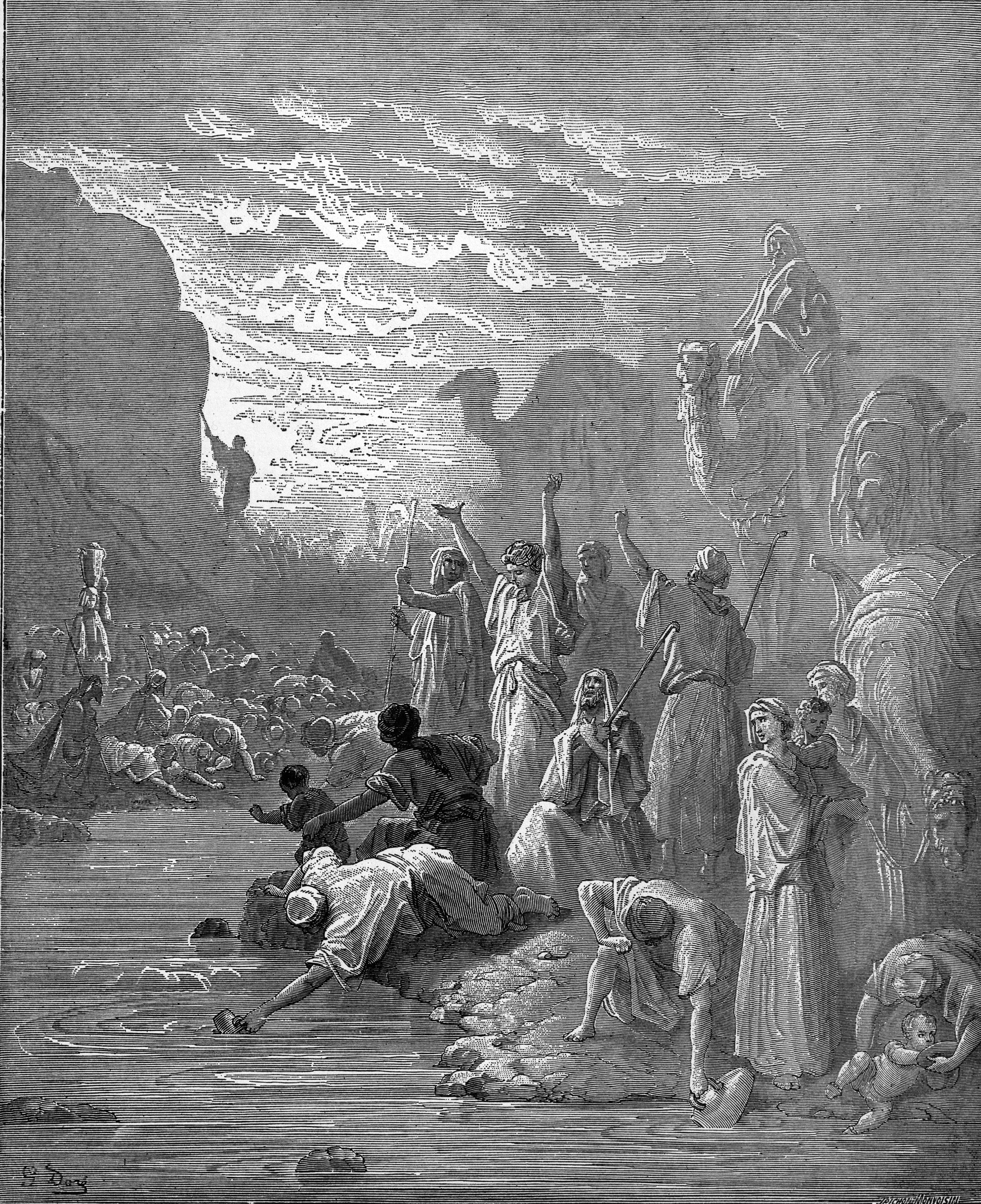
Moses Striking the Rock in Horeb (engraving by Gustave Doré from the 1865 La Sainte Bible)

A Master taught that as long as the generation of the wilderness continued to die out, there was no Divine communication to Moses (in a direct manner, as Numbers 12:8 describes, "face to face"). For Moses recounted in Deuteronomy 2:16–17, "So it came to pass, when all the men of war were consumed and dead . . . that the Lord spoke to me." Only then (after those deaths) did the Divine communication to Moses resume. Thus God's address to Moses in Numbers 20:6–8 may have been the first time that God had spoken to Moses in 38 years.

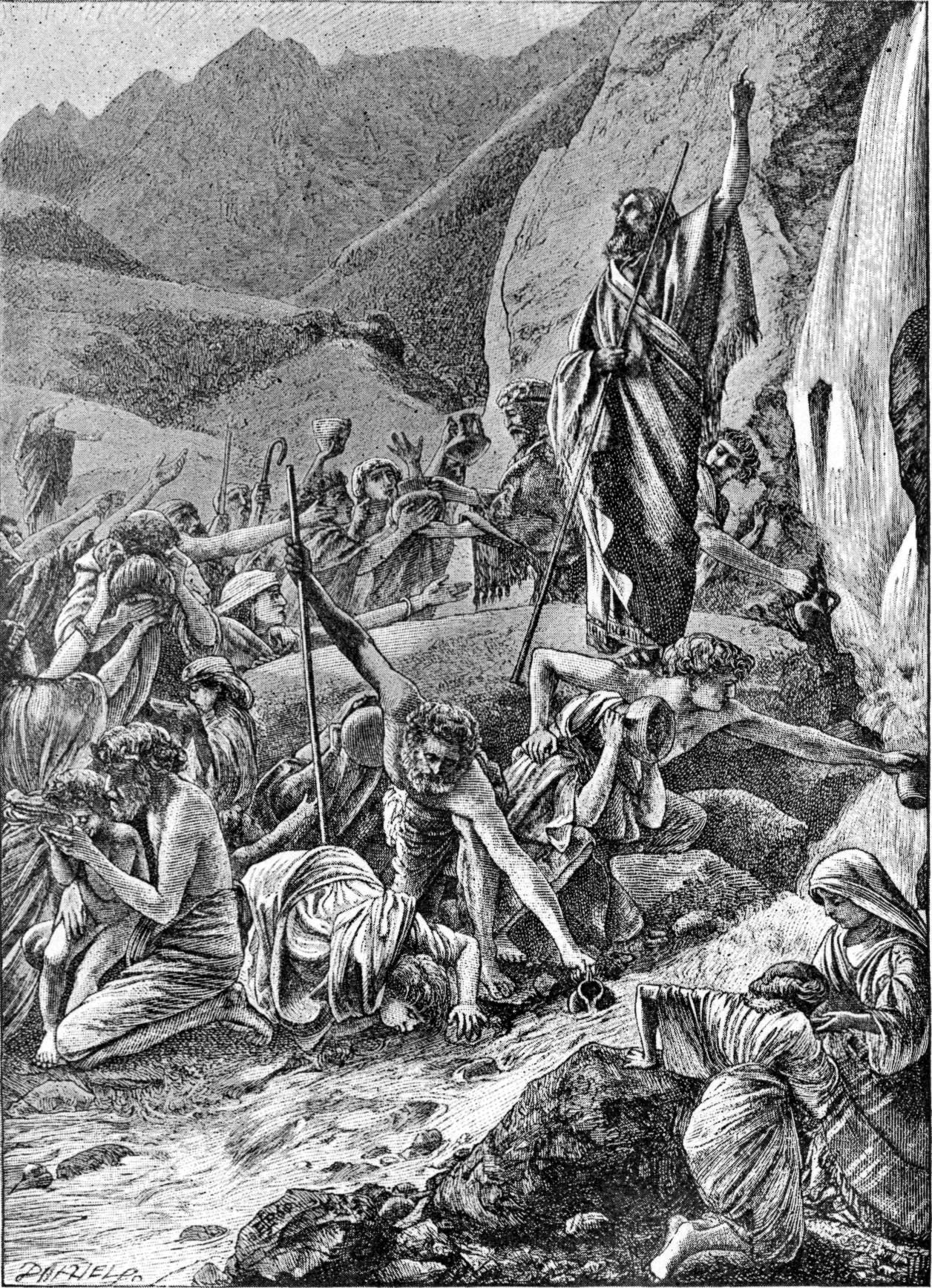
Moses Has Struck the Rock with His Rod, and Water Is Coming Out (illustration from the 1897 Bible Pictures and What They Teach Us by Charles Foster)

A midrash read God's instruction in Numbers 20:8, "bring forth to them water out of the rock; so you shall give the congregation and their cattle drink," to teach that God was considerate of even the Israelites' property—their animals.

The Mishnah counted the well that accompanied the Israelites through the desert in the merit of Miriam, or others say, the well that Moses opened by striking the rock in Numbers 20:11, among ten miraculous things that God created at twilight on the eve of the first Sabbath.

A midrash interpreted Numbers 20:11 to teach that Moses struck the rock once and small quantities of water began to trickle from the rock, as Psalm 78:20 says, "Behold, He smote the rock, that waters issued." Then the people ridiculed Moses, asking if this was water for sucklings, or babes weaned from milk. So Moses lost his temper and struck the rock "twice; and water came forth abundantly" (in the words of Numbers 20:11), overwhelming all those who had railed at Moses, and as Psalm 78:20 says, "And streams overflowed."

Reading God's criticism of Moses in Numbers 20:12, "Because you did not believe in Me," a midrash asked whether Moses had not previously said worse when in Numbers 11:22, he showed a greater lack of faith and questioned God's powers asking: "If flocks and herds be slain for them, will they suffice them? Or if all the fish of the sea be gathered together for them, will they suffice them?" The midrash explained by relating the case of a king who had a friend who displayed arrogance towards the king privately, using harsh words. The king did not, however, lose his temper with his friend. Later, the friend displayed his arrogance in the presence of the king's legions, and the king sentenced his friend to death. So also God told Moses that the first offense that Moses committed (in Numbers 11:22) was a private matter between Moses and God. But now that Moses had committed a second offense against God in public, it was impossible for God to overlook it, and God had to react, as Numbers 20:12 reports, "To sanctify Me in the eyes of the children of Israel."

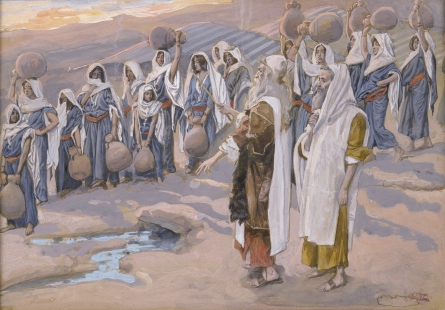
Moses Smites the Rock in the Desert (watercolor circa 1896–1902 by James Tissot)

Rabbi Simeon ben Eleazar taught that Moses and Aaron died because of their sin, as Numbers 20:12 reports God told them, "Because you did not believe in Me . . . you shall not bring this assembly into the land that I have given them." Rabbi Simeon ben Eleazar thus taught that had they believed in God, their time would not yet have come to depart from the world.

The Gemara implied that the sin of Moses in striking the rock at Meribah compared favorably to the sin of David. The Gemara reported that Moses and David were two good leaders of Israel. Moses begged God that his sin be recorded, as it is in Numbers 20:12, 20:23–24, and 27:13–14, and Deuteronomy 32:51. David, however, begged that his sin be blotted out, as Psalm 32:1 says, "Happy is he whose transgression is forgiven, whose sin is pardoned." The Gemara compared the cases of Moses and David to the cases of two women whom the court sentenced to be lashed. One had committed an indecent act, while the other had eaten unripe figs of the seventh year in violation of Leviticus 25:6. The woman who had eaten unripe figs begged the court to make known for what offense she was being flogged, lest people say that she was being punished for the same sin as the other woman. The court thus made known her sin, and the Torah repeatedly records the sin of Moses.

Resh Lakish taught that Providence punishes bodily those who unjustifiably suspect the innocent. In Exodus 4:1, Moses said that the Israelites "will not believe me," but God knew that the Israelites would believe. God thus told Moses that the Israelites were believers and descendants of believers, while Moses would ultimately disbelieve. The Gemara explained that Exodus 4:13 reports that "the people believed" and Genesis 15:6 reports that the Israelites' ancestor Abraham "believed in the Lord," while Numbers 20:12 reports that Moses "did not believe." Thus, Moses was smitten when in Exodus 4:6 God turned his hand white as snow.

A midrash employed a parable to explain why God held Aaron as well as Moses responsible when Moses struck the rock, as Numbers 20:12 reports, "and the Lord said to Moses and Aaron: 'Because you did not believe in Me.'" The midrash told how a creditor came to take away a debtor's granary and took both the debtor's granary and the debtor's neighbor's granary. The debtor asked the creditor what his neighbor had done to warrant such treatment. Similarly, Moses asked God what Aaron had done to be blamed when Moses lost his temper. The midrash taught that it on this account that Deuteronomy 33:8 praises Aaron, saying, "And of Levi he said: 'Your Thummim and your Urim be with your holy one, whom you proved at Massah, with whom you strove at the waters of Meribah.'"

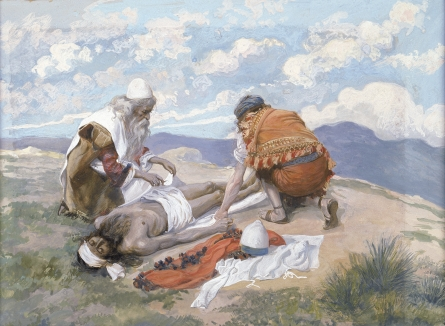
The Death of Aaron (watercolor circa 1896–1902 by James Tissot)

A midrash interpreted the name "Mount Hor" (הֹר הָהָר, hor hahar) in Numbers 20:22 to mean a mountain on top of a mountain, like a small apple on top of a larger apple. The midrash taught that the Cloud went before the Israelites to level mountains and raise valleys so that the Israelites would not become exhausted, except that God left Mount Sinai for the Divine Presence, Mount Hor for the burial of Aaron, and Mount Nebo for the burial of Moses.

A midrash noted the use of the verb "take" (קַח, kach) in Numbers 20:25 and interpreted it to mean that God instructed Moses to take Aaron with comforting words. The midrash thus taught that Moses comforted Aaron by explaining to him that he would pass his crown on to his son, a fate that Moses himself would not merit.

The Sifre taught that when Moses saw the merciful manner of Aaron's death, Moses concluded that he would want to die the same way. The Sifre taught that God told Aaron to go in a cave, to climb onto a bier, to spread his hands, to spread his legs, to close his mouth, and to close his eyes, and then Aaron died. At that moment, Moses concluded that one would be happy to die that way. And that is why God later told Moses in Deuteronomy 32:50 that Moses would die "as Aaron your brother died on Mount Hor, and was gathered unto his people," for that was the manner of death that Moses had wanted.

A midrash interpreted the words "all the congregation saw that Aaron was dead" in Numbers 20:29. The midrash taught that when Moses and Eleazar descended from the mountain without Aaron, all the congregation assembled against Moses and Eleazar and demanded to know where Aaron was. When Moses and Eleazar answered that Aaron had died, the congregation objected that surely the Angel of Death could not strike the one who had withstood the Angel of Death and had restrained him, as reported in Numbers 17:13: "And he stood between the dead and the living and the plague was stayed." The congregation demanded that Moses and Eleazar bring Aaron back, or they would stone Moses and Eleazar. Moses prayed to God to deliver them from suspicion, and God immediately opened the cave and showed the congregation Aaron's body, as reflected by the words of Numbers 20:29 that "all the congregation saw that Aaron was dead."

=== Numbers chapter 21 ===
The Gemara deduced that what the King of Arad heard in Numbers 21:1 was that Aaron had died and that the clouds of glory had dispersed, as the previous verse, Numbers 20:29, reports that "all the congregation saw that Aaron was dead." The King thus concluded that he had received permission to fight the Israelites.

The Gemara deduced from the report of Numbers 21:1 that the king of Arad took some Israelites captive that a non-Jew could acquire an Israelite as a slave by an act of possession.

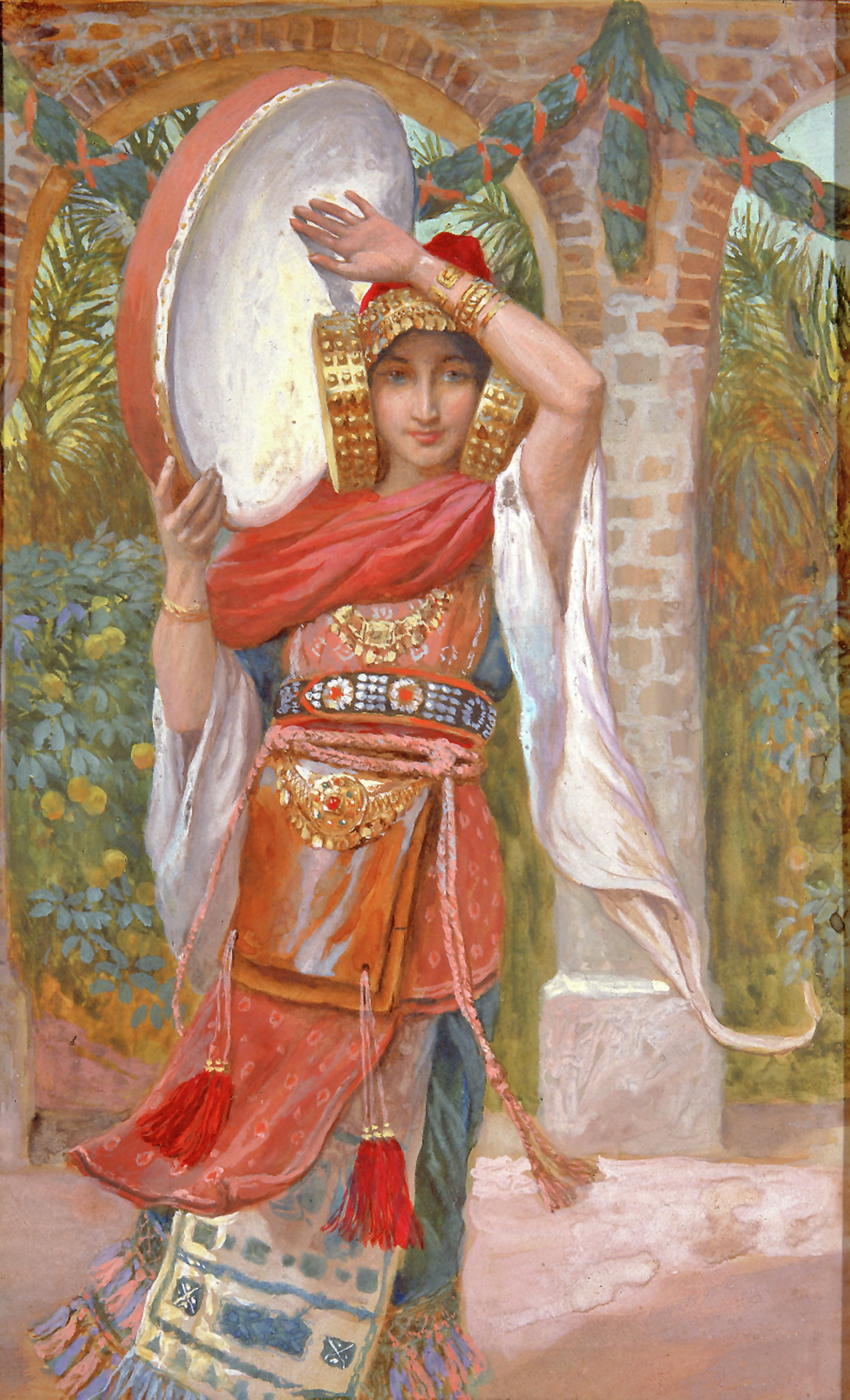
Jephthah's Daughter (watercolor circa 1896–1902 by James Tissot)

Rav Ḥanin (or some say Rabbi Ḥanina) read Numbers 21:2 to show that one who wishes to succeed should set aside some of the gains to Heaven. The Gemara thus taught that one who took possession of the property of a proselyte (who died without any Jewish heirs and thus had no legal heirs) should use some of the proceeds of the property to purchase a Torah scroll to be worthy of retaining the rest of the property. Similarly, Rav Sheshet taught that a person should act in a similar manner with a deceased spouse's estate. Rava taught that even a businessperson who made a large profit should act in a similar manner. Rav Papa taught that one who has found something should act in the same manner. Rav Nahman bar Isaac said even if a person only arranged for the writing of a pair of Tefillin (that would be a sufficient deed).

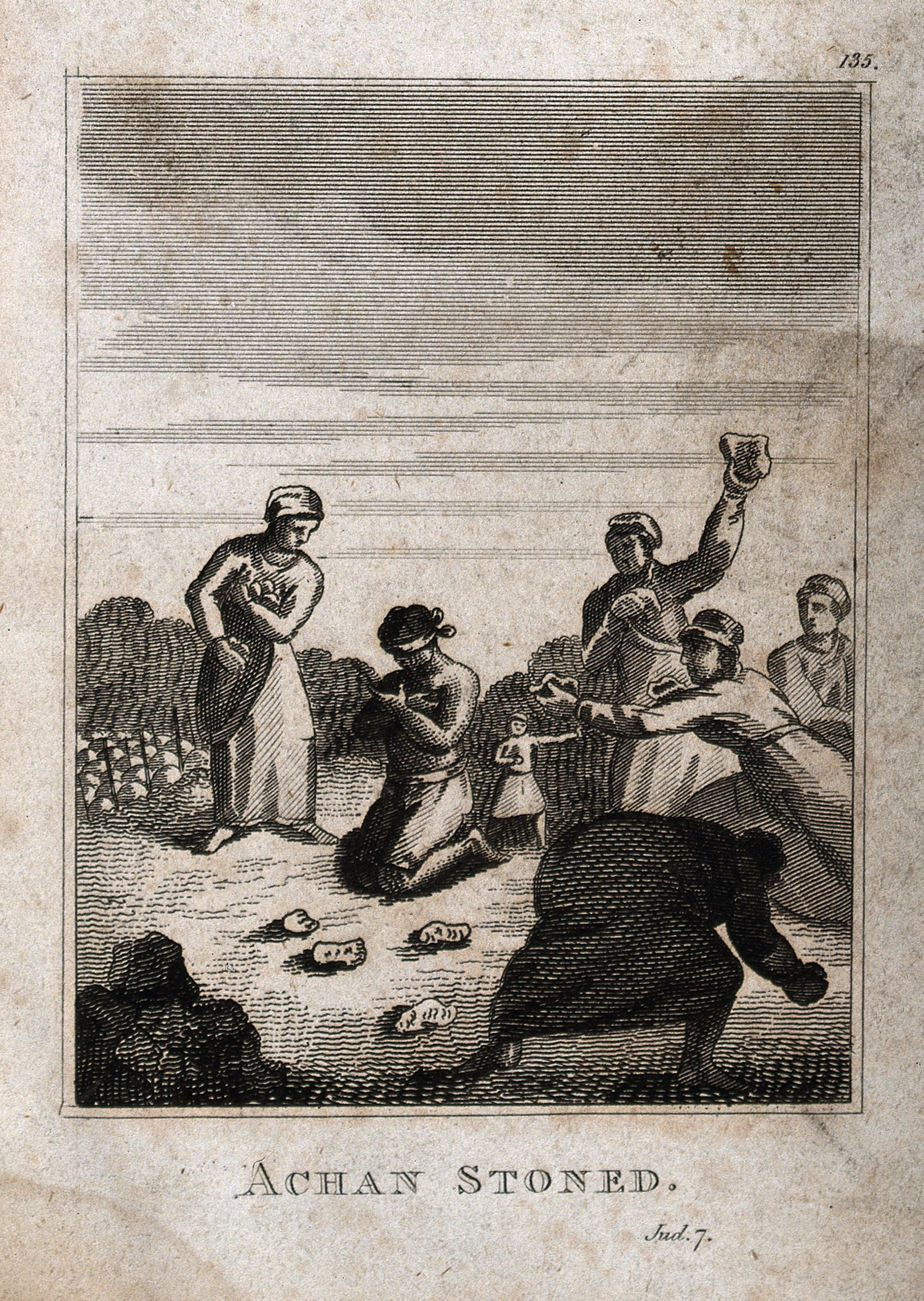
Achan is stoned for stealing the spoils of Jericho

A midrash taught that of four who made vows, two vowed and profited, and two vowed and lost. The Israelites vowed and profited in Numbers 21:2–3, and Hannah vowed and profited in 1 Samuel 1:11–20. Jephthah vowed and lost in Judges 11:30–40, and Jacob vowed in Genesis 28:20 and lost (some say in the loss of Rachel in Genesis 35:18 and some say in the disgrace of Dinah in Genesis 34:2, for Jacob's vow in Genesis 28:20 was superfluous, as Jacob had already received God's promise, and therefore Jacob lost because of it).

Rav Assi said in Rabbi Ḥanina's name that Achan's confession to Joshua in Joshua 7:20 showed that Achan committed three sacrileges—twice in the days of Moses, including once violating the oath of Numbers 21:2, and once in the days of Joshua. For in Joshua 7:20, Achan said, "I have sinned (implying this time), and thus and thus have I done (implying twice apart from this instance)."

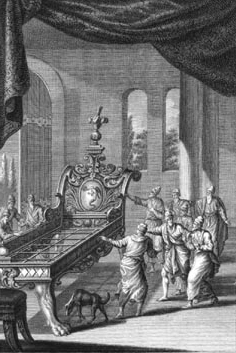
Og's bed (engraving circa 1770 by Johann Balthasar Probst)

A midrash taught that according to some authorities, Israel fought Sihon in the month of Elul, celebrated the festival in Tishri, and after the festival fought Og. The midrash inferred this from the similarity of the expression in Deuteronomy 16:7, "And you shall turn in the morning, and go to your tents," which speaks of an act that was to follow the celebration of a festival, and the expression in Numbers 21:3, "and Og the king of Bashan went out against them, he and all his people." The midrash inferred that God assembled the Amorites to deliver them into the Israelites' hands, as Numbers 21:34 says, "and the Lord said to Moses: 'Fear him not; for I have delivered him into your hand." The midrash taught that Moses was afraid, as he thought that perhaps the Israelites had committed a trespass in the war against Sihon or had soiled themselves by the commission of some transgression. God reassured Moses that he need not fear, for the Israelites had shown themselves perfectly righteous. The midrash taught that there was not a mighty man in the world more difficult to overcome than Og, as Deuteronomy 3:11 says, "only Og king of Bashan remained of the remnant of the Rephaim." The midrash told that Og had been the only survivor of the strong men whom Amraphel and his colleagues had slain, as may be inferred from Genesis 14:5, which reports that Amraphel "smote the Rephaim in Ashteroth-karnaim," and one may read Deuteronomy 3:1 to indicate that Og lived near Ashteroth. The midrash taught that Og was the refuse among the Rephaim, like a hard olive that escapes being mashed in the olive press. The midrash inferred this from Genesis 14:13, which reports that "there came one who had escaped and told Abram the Hebrew," and the midrash identified the man who had escaped as Og, as Deuteronomy 3:11 describes him as a remnant, saying, "only Og king of Bashan remained of the remnant of the Rephaim." The midrash taught that Og intended that Abram should go out and be killed. God rewarded Og for delivering the message by allowing him to live all the years from Abraham to Moses, but God collected Og's debt to God for his evil intention toward Abraham by causing Og to fall by the hand of Abraham's descendants. On coming to make war with Og, Moses was afraid, thinking that he was only 120 years old, while Og was more than 500 years old, and if Og had not possessed some merit, he would not have lived all those years. So God told Moses (in the words of Numbers 21:34), "fear him not; for I have delivered him into your hand," implying that Moses should slay Og with his own hand. The midrash noted that in Deuteronomy 3:2, God told Moses to "do to him as you did to Sihon," and Deuteronomy 3:6 reports that the Israelites "utterly destroyed them," but Deuteronomy 3:7 reports, "All the cattle, and the spoil of the cities, we took for a prey to ourselves." The midrash concluded that the Israelites utterly destroyed the people so as not to derive any benefit from them.

Rabbi Eleazar ben Perata taught that manna counteracted the ill effects of foreign foods on the Israelites. But the Gemara taught after the Israelites complained about the manna in Numbers 21:5, God burdened the Israelites with the walk of three parasangs to get outside their camp to answer the call of nature. And it was then that the command of Deuteronomy 23:14, "And you shall have a paddle among your weapons," began to apply to the Israelites.

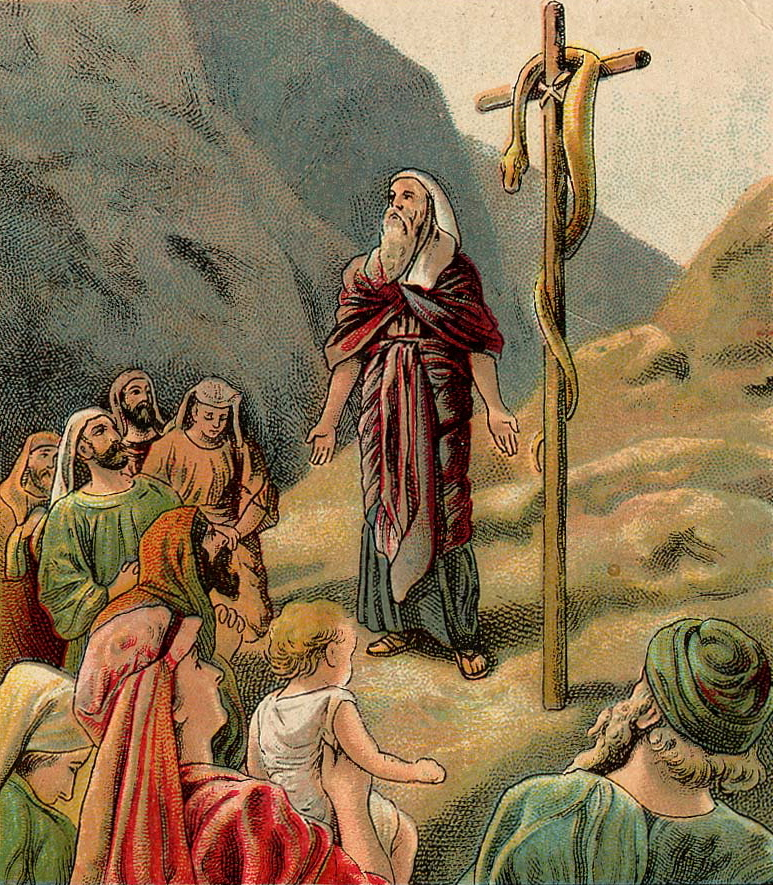
The Brazen Serpent (illustration from a Bible card published 1907 by Providence Lithograph Company)

A midrash explained that God punished the Israelites by means of serpents in Numbers 21:6, because the serpent was the first to speak slander in Genesis 3:4–5. God cursed the serpent, but the Israelites did not learn a lesson from the serpent's fate, and nonetheless spoke slander. God therefore sent the serpent, who was the first to introduce slander, to punish those who spoke slander.

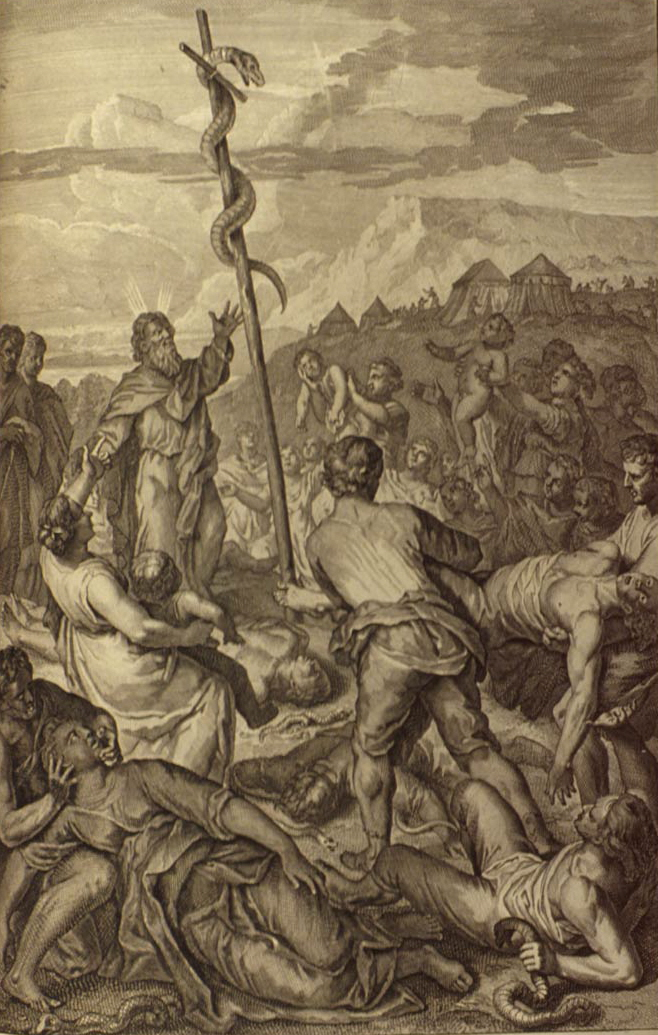
Moses Fixes the Brazen Serpent on a Pole (illustration from the 1728 Figures de la Bible)

Reading Numbers 21:7, the midrash told that the people realized that they had spoken against Moses and prostrated themselves before him and beseeched him to pray to God on their behalf. The midrash taught that then Numbers 21:7 immediately reports, "And Moses prayed," to demonstrate the meekness of Moses, who did not hesitate to seek mercy for them, and also to show the power of repentance, for as soon as they said, "We have sinned," Moses was immediately reconciled to them, for one who is in a position to forgive should not be cruel by refusing to forgive. In the same strain, Genesis 20:17 reports, "And Abraham prayed to God; and God healed" (after Abimelech had wronged Abraham and asked for forgiveness). And similarly, Job 42:10 reports, "And the Lord changed the fortune of Job, when he prayed for his friends" (after they had slandered him). The midrash taught that when one person wrongs another but then says, "I have sinned," the victim is called a sinner if the victim does not forgive the offender. For in 1 Samuel 12:23, Samuel told the Israelites, "As for me, far be it from me that I should sin against the Lord in ceasing to pray for you," and Samuel told them this after they came and said, "We have sinned," as 1 Samuel 12:19 indicates when it reports that the people said, "Pray for your servants . . . for we have added to all our sins this evil."

The Mishnah taught that the brass serpent of Numbers 21:8–9 effected its miraculous cure because when the Israelites directed their thoughts upward and turned their hearts to God they were healed, but otherwise they perished.

In the Jerusalem Talmud, Rabbi Yassa noted that in four places, including Numbers 21:8, Scripture uses the expression, "make for yourself (עֲשֵׂה לְךָ, oseh l'cha)." In three of those instances, God explained the material from which to make the thing, and in one God did not. Genesis 6:14 says, "Make for yourself an ark of gopher wood"; Numbers 10:2 says, "make for yourself two silver trumpets"; and Joshua 5:2 says, "make for yourself knives of flint." But Numbers 21:8 says merely, "make for yourself a fiery serpent" without further explanation. So Moses reasoned that a serpent is essentially a snake, and made the snake of copper, because in Hebrew, the word for copper (נְחֹשֶׁת, nechoshet) sounds like the word for snake (נְחַשׁ, nechash).

The Mekhilta of Rabbi Ishmael counted 10 songs in the Tanakh: (1) the one that the Israelites recited at the first Passover in Egypt, as Isaiah 30:29 says, "You shall have a song as in the night when a feast is hallowed"; (2) the Song of the sea in Exodus 15; (3) the one that the Israelites sang at the well in the wilderness, as Numbers 21:17 reports, "Then sang Israel this song: 'Spring up, O well'"; (4) the one that Moses spoke in his last days, as Deuteronomy 31:30 reports, "Moses spoke in the ears of all the assembly of Israel the words of this song"; (5) the one that Joshua recited, as Joshua 10:12 reports, "Then spoke Joshua to the Lord in the day when the Lord delivered up the Amorites"; (6) the one that Deborah and Barak sang, as Judges 5:1 reports, "Then sang Deborah and Barak the son of Abinoam"; (7) the one that David spoke, as 2 Samuel 22:1 reports, "David spoke to the Lord the words of this song in the day that the Lord delivered him out of the hand of all his enemies, and out of the hand of Saul"; (8) the one that Solomon recited, as Psalm 30:1 reports, "a song at the Dedication of the House of David"; (9) the one that Jehoshaphat recited, as 2 Chronicles 20:21 reports: "when he had taken counsel with the people, he appointed them that should sing to the Lord, and praise in the beauty of holiness, as they went out before the army, and say, 'Give thanks to the Lord, for His mercy endures forever'"; and (10) the song that will be sung in the time to come, as Isaiah 42:10 says, "Sing to the Lord a new song, and His praise from the end of the earth," and Psalm 149:1 says, "Sing to the Lord a new song, and His praise in the assembly of the saints."

A midrash interpreted the Israelites' encounter with Sihon in Numbers 21:21–31 and Deuteronomy 2:24–3:10. Noting the report of Numbers 21:21–22 that "Israel sent messengers to Sihon king of the Amorites, saying: 'Let me pass through your land,'" the midrash taught that the Israelites sent messengers to Sihon just as they had to Edom to inform the Edomites that the Israelites would not cause Edom any damage. Noting the report of Deuteronomy 2:28 that the Israelites offered Sihon, "You shall sell me food for money . . . and give me water for money," the midrash noted that water is generally given away for free, but the Israelites offered to pay for it. The midrash noted that in Numbers 21:21, the Israelites offered, "We will go by the king's highway," but in Deuteronomy 2:29, the Israelites admitted that they would go "until [they] shall pass over the Jordan," thus admitting that they were going to conquer Canaan. The midrash compared the matter to a watchman who received wages to watch a vineyard, and to whom a visitor came and asked the watchman to go away so that the visitor could cut off the grapes from the vineyard. The watchman replied that the sole reason that the watchman stood guard was because of the visitor. The midrash explained that the same was true of Sihon, as all the kings of Canaan paid Sihon money from their taxes, since Sihon appointed them as kings. The midrash interpreted Psalm 135:11, which says, "Sihon king of the Amorites, and Og king of Bashan, and all the kingdoms of Canaan," to teach that Sihon and Og were the equal of all the other kings of Canaan. So the Israelites asked Sihon to let them pass through Sihon's land to conquer the kings of Canaan, and Sihon replied that the sole reason that he was there was to protect the kings of Canaan from the Israelites. Interpreting the words of Numbers 21:23, "and Sihon would not suffer Israel to pass through his border; but Sihon gathered all his people together," the midrash taught that God brought this about designedly to deliver Sihon into the Israelites' hands without trouble. The midrash interpreted the words of Deuteronomy 3:2, "Sihon king of the Amorites, who dwelt at Heshbon," to say that if Heshbon had been full of mosquitoes, no person could have conquered it, and if Sihon had been living in a plain, no person could have prevailed over him. The midrash taught that Sihon thus would have been invincible, as he was powerful and dwelt in a fortified city. Interpreting the words, "Who dwelt at Heshbon," the midrash taught that had Sihon and his armies remained in different towns, the Israelites would have worn themselves out conquering them all. But God assembled them in one place to deliver them into the Israelites' hands without trouble. In the same vein, in Deuteronomy 2:31 God said, "Behold, I have begun to deliver up Sihon . . . before you," and Numbers 21:23 says, "Sihon gathered all his people together," and Numbers 21:23 reports, "And Israel took all these cities."

Even though in Deuteronomy 2:9 and 2:19, God forbade the Israelites from occupying the territory of Ammon and Moab, Rav Papa taught that the land of Ammon and Moab that Sihon conquered (as reported in Numbers 21:26) became purified for acquisition by the Israelites through Sihon's occupation of it (as discussed in Judges 11:13–23).

The Pirke De-Rabbi Eliezer identified Og, king of Bashan, introduced in Numbers 21:33, with Abraham's servant Eliezer, introduced in Genesis 15:2, and with the unnamed steward of Abraham's household in Genesis 24:2. The Pirke De-Rabbi Eliezer told that when Abraham left Ur of the Chaldees, all the magnates of the kingdom gave him gifts, and Nimrod gave Abraham Nimrod's first-born son Eliezer as a perpetual slave. After Eliezer had dealt kindly with Isaac by securing Rebekah to be Isaac's wife, he set Eliezer free, and God gave Eliezer his reward in this world by raising him up to become a king—Og, king of Bashan.

== In medieval Jewish interpretation ==
The parashah is discussed in these medieval Jewish sources:

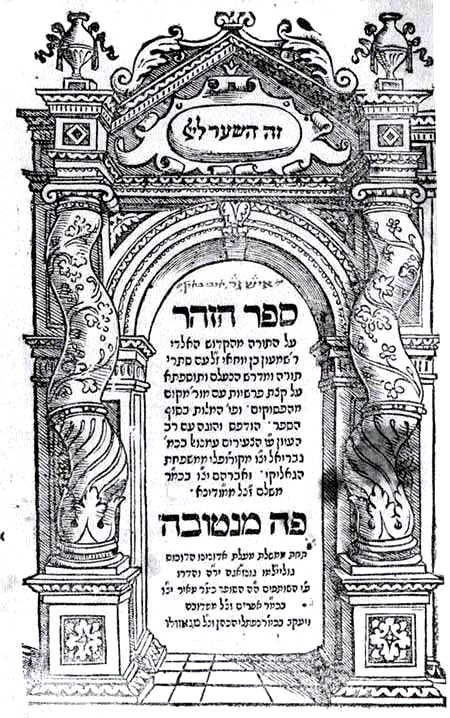
Zohar

=== Numbers chapter 19 ===
The Zohar taught that Numbers 19:2, "a red heifer, faultless, wherein is no blemish, and upon which never came yoke," epitomized the four Kingdoms foretold in Daniel 8. The "heifer" is Israel, of whom Hosea 4:16 says, "For Israel is stubborn like a stubborn heifer." "Red" indicates Babylonia, regarding which Daniel 2:38 says, "you are the head of gold." "Faultless" points to Media (an allusion to Cyrus the Great, who liberated the Babylonian Jews). "Wherein is no blemish" indicates Greece (who were near the true faith). And "upon which never came yoke" alludes to Edom, that is, Rome, which was never under the yoke of any other power.

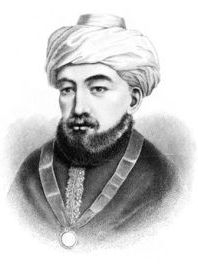
Moses Maimonides

Maimonides noted that a dead body communicates uncleanliness very easily to those under the same roof, especially to relatives. Noting further how scarce red heifers have been, Maimonides concluded that the easier that something communicates uncleanliness, the more difficult is its purification.

Maimonides taught that nine red heifers were offered from the time that the Israelites were commanded to fulfill the commandment until the time when the Temple was destroyed a second time. Moses brought the first, Ezra brought the second, seven others were offered until the destruction of the Second Temple, and the Messiah will bring the tenth.

== In modern interpretation ==
The parashah is discussed in these modern sources:

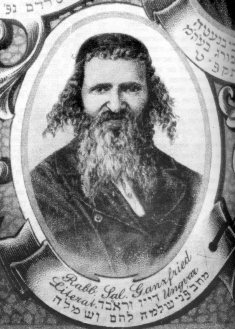
Shlomo Ganzfried, editor of the Kitzur Shulchan Aruch

=== Numbers chapter 19 ===
Gordon Wenham wrote that "the ashes of the red heifer were effectively an instant ever-ready sacrifice."

Adin Steinsaltz reported the tradition that after the destruction of the Second Temple, Jews carefully preserved some remaining Red Cow ashes and used them to purify Jews for generations—some say as long as 300 years. When they used up the Red Cow ashes, it was no longer possible to purify those defiled by contact with the dead, and thus, since the Middle Ages, Jews have assumed that everyone is defiled by either direct or indirect contact with the dead.

Reflecting the uncleanness that dead bodies convey (as discussed in Numbers 19), the Kitzur Shulchan Aruch required one to wash one's hands after leaving a cemetery, attending a funeral, or entering a covered area in which a dead person lay.

=== Numbers chapter 20 ===
Ora Horn Prouser noted that in Numbers 20:10, before hitting the rock, Moses cried "Listen, you rebels!" using a word for "rebels," מֹּרִים, morim, that appears nowhere else in the Bible in this form, but which in its unvocalized form is identical with the name Miriam, מִרְיָם. Horn Prouser suggested that this verbal coincidence may intimate that Moses' behavior had as much to do with the loss of Miriam reported in Numbers 20:1 as with his frustration with the Israelite people. Horn Prouser suggested that when faced with the task of producing water, Moses recalled his older sister, his co-leader, and the clever caretaker who guarded him at the Nile.

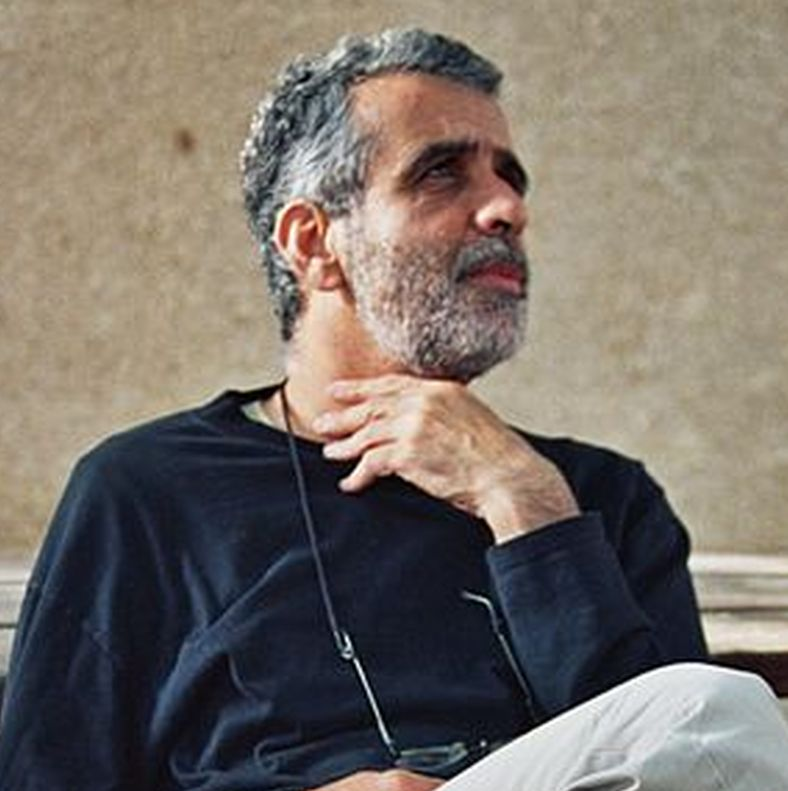
Finkelstein

=== Numbers chapter 21 ===
Israel Finkelstein and Neil Asher Silberman noted that Numbers 21:1–3 recounts how the Canaanite king of Arad, "who dwelt in the Negeb," attacked the Israelites and took some of them captive—enraging them so that they appealed for Divine assistance to destroy all the Canaanite cities. Finkelstein and Silberman reported that almost 20 years of intensive excavations at Tel Arad east of Beersheba have revealed remains of a great Early Bronze Age city, about 25 acres in size, and an Iron Age fort, but no remains whatsoever from the Late Bronze Age, when the place was apparently deserted. Finkelstein and Silberman reported the same holds true for the entire Beersheba valley. Arad did not exist in the Late Bronze Age. Finkelstein and Silberman reported that the same situation is evident eastward across the Jordan, where Numbers 21:21–25; Deuteronomy 2:24–35; and Judges 11:19–21 report that the wandering Israelites battled at the city of Heshbon, capital of Sihon, king of the Amorites, who tried to block the Israelites from passing through his territory on their way to Canaan. Excavations at Tel Hesban south of Amman, the location of ancient Heshbon, showed that there was no Late Bronze city, not even a small village, there. And Finkelstein and Silberman noted that according to the Bible, when the children of Israel moved along the Transjordanian plateau they met and confronted resistance not only in Moab but also from the full-fledged states of Edom and Ammon. Yet the archeological evidence indicates that the Transjordan plateau was very sparsely inhabited in the Late Bronze Age, and most parts of the region, including Edom, mentioned as a state ruled by a king, were not even inhabited by a sedentary population at that time, and thus no kings of Edom could have been there for the Israelites to meet. Finkelstein and Silberman concluded that sites mentioned in the Exodus narrative were unoccupied at the time they reportedly played a role in the events of the Israelites wanderings in the wilderness, and thus a mass Exodus did not happen at the time and in the manner described in the Bible.

== Commandments ==
=== According to Maimonides ===
Maimonides cited a verse in the parashah for 1 positive commandment:

- To prepare a Red Cow so that its ashes are ready

=== According to Sefer ha-Chinuch ===
According to Sefer ha-Chinuch, there are 3 positive commandments in the parashah:

- The precept of the Red Cow
- The precept of the ritual uncleanness of the dead
- The precept of the lustral water, that it defiles a ritually clean person and purifies only one defined by the dead

== In the liturgy ==
The people's murmuring and perhaps the rock that yielded water at Meribah of Numbers 20:3–13 are reflected in Psalm 95, which is in turn the first of the six Psalms recited at the beginning of the Kabbalat Shabbat prayer service.

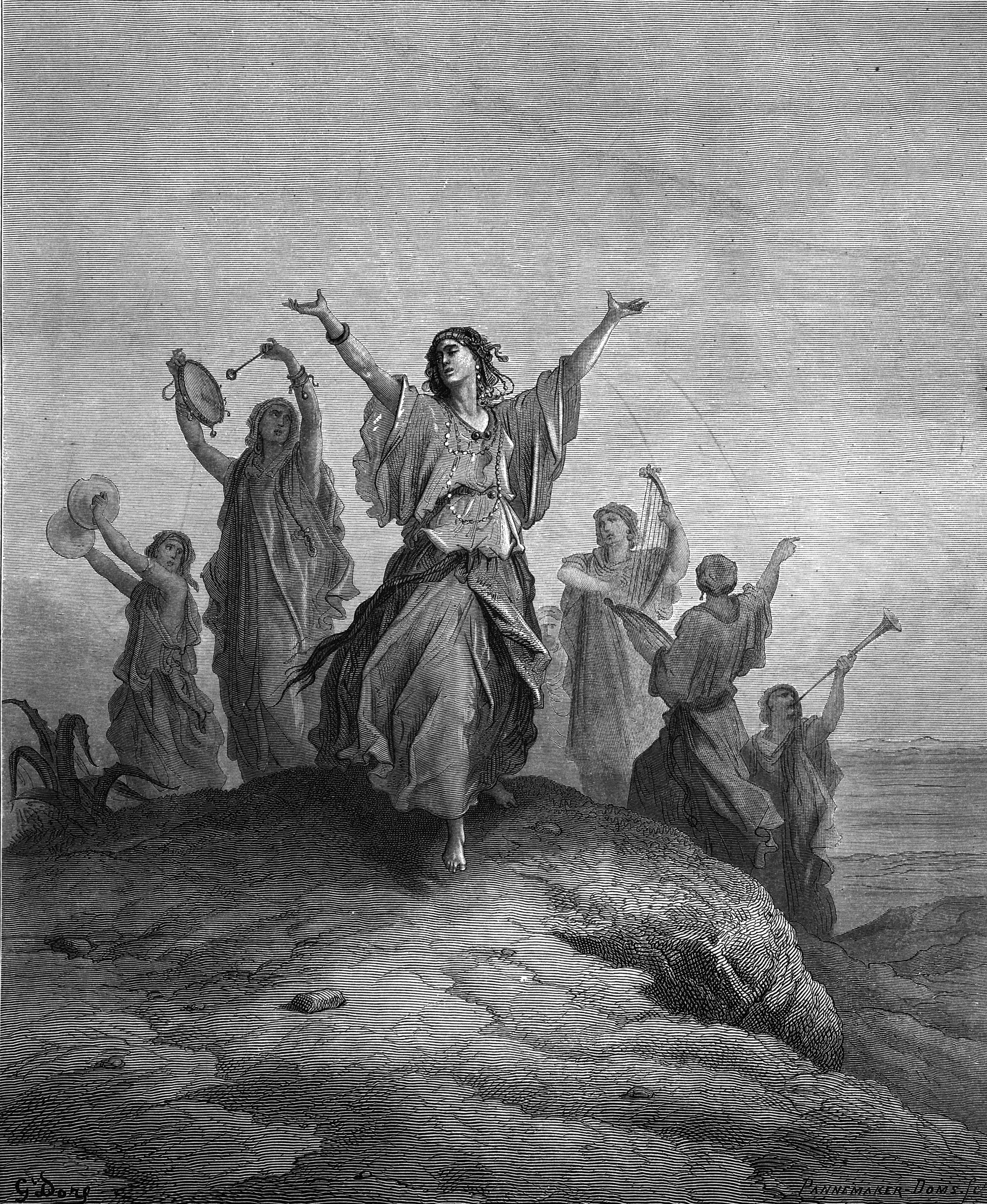
Jephtha's Daughter (engraving by Gustave Doré from the 1865 La Sainte Bible)

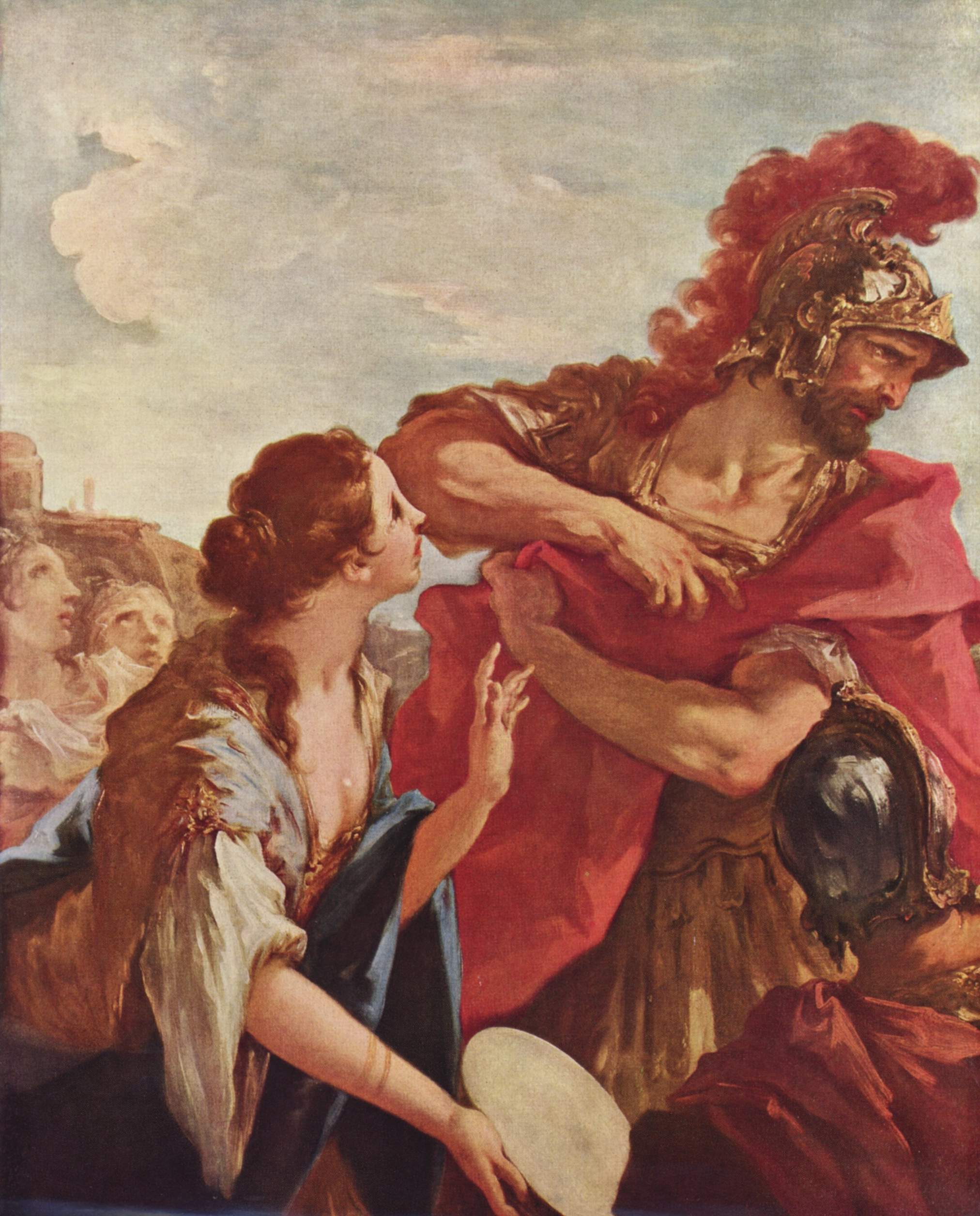
The Return of Jephtha (painting circa 1700–1725 by Giovanni Antonio Pellegrini)

== Haftarah ==
=== Generally ===
The haftarah for the parashah is Judges 11:1–33. Both the parashah and the haftarah involve diplomatic missions about land issues. In the parashah, Moses sent messengers and tried to negotiate passage over the lands of the Edomites and the Amorites of Sihon. In the haftarah, Jephthah sent messengers to the Ammonites prior to hostilities over their land. In the course of Jephthah's message to the Ammonites, he recounted the embassies described in the parashah. And Jephthah's also recounted the Israelites' victory over the Amorites described in the parashah. Both the parashah and the haftarah involve vows. In the parashah, the Israelites vowed that if God delivered the Canaanites of Arad into their hands, then the Israelites would utterly destroy their cities. In the haftarah, Jephthah vowed that if God would deliver the Ammonites into his hand, then Jephthah would offer as a burnt-offering whatever first came forth out of his house to meet him when he returned. The haftarah concludes just before the verses that report that Jephthah's daughter was first to greet him, proving his vow to have been improvident.

=== For Parashat Chukat–Balak ===
When Parashat Chukat is combined with Parashat Balak (as it is in 2026 and 2027), the haftarah is the haftarah for Balak, Micah 5:6–6:8.

=== For Shabbat Rosh Chodesh ===
When Parashat Chukat coincides with Shabbat Rosh Chodesh, the haftarah is Isaiah 66:1–24.
