= Marah (Bible) =

Place travelled through in the Exodus

Coordinates: 29°20′N 32°55′E

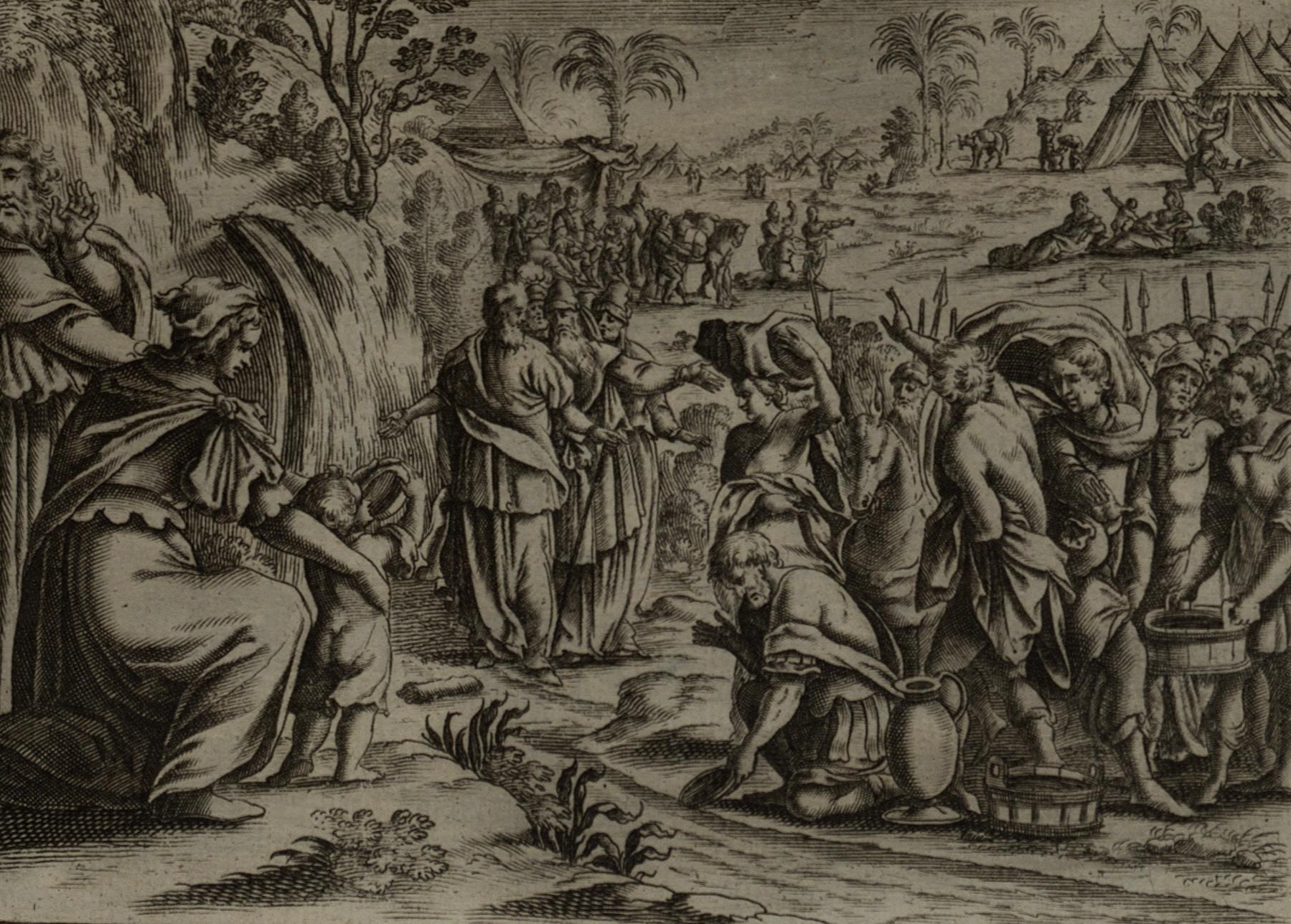
The Water of Marah, engraving by Gérard Jollain, 1670.

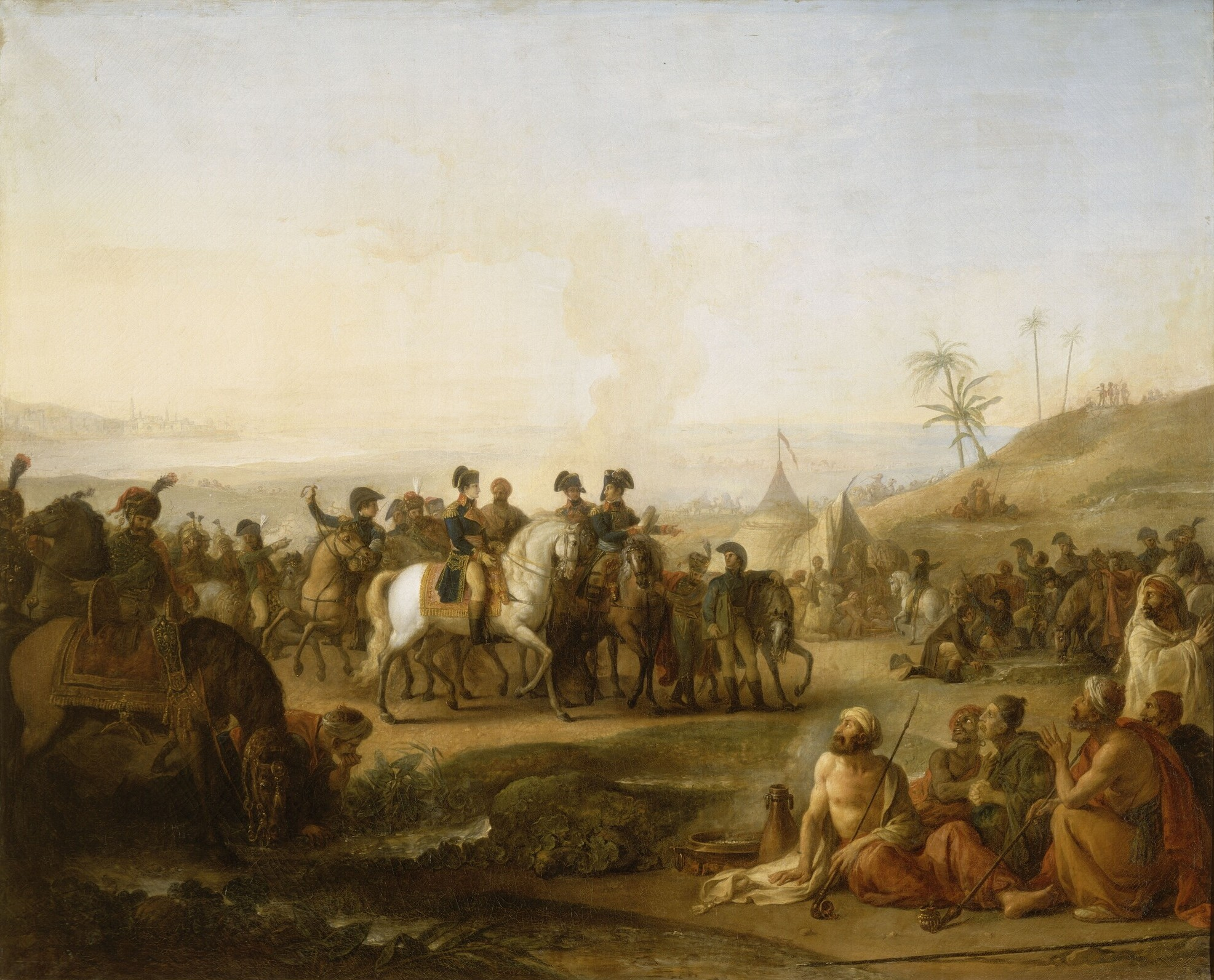
Bonaparte visiting the "Water of Marah" in December 1798 during the Egyptian expedition.

Marah (Hebrew: מָרָה meaning 'bitter') is one of the locations which the Exodus identifies as having been travelled through by the Israelites, during the Exodus.

The liberated Israelites set out on their journey in the desert, somewhere in the Sinai Peninsula. It becomes clear that they are not spiritually free. Reaching Marah, the place of a well of bitter water, bitterness and murmuring, Israel receives a first set of divine ordinances and the foundation of the Shabbat. The shortage of water there is followed by a shortness of food. Moses throws a log into the bitter water, making it sweet. Later God sends manna and quail. The desert is the ground where God acquires his people. The 'murmuring motifi' is a recurring perspective of Hebrew people.

Marah - bitterness - a fountain at the sixth station of the Israelites (Ex. 15:23, 24; Num. 33:8) whose waters were so bitter that they could not drink them. On this account they murmured against Moses, who, under divine direction, cast into the fountain "a certain tree" which took away its bitterness, so that the people drank of it. This was probably the 'Ain Hawarah, where there are still several springs of water that are very "bitter," distant some 47 miles from 'Ayun Mousa.

— Easton's 1897 Bible Dictionary

== Events ==
The narrative concerning Marah in the Book of Exodus states that the Israelites had been wandering in the desert for three days without water; according to the narrative, Marah had water, but it was undrinkably bitter, hence the name, which means bitterness. In the text, when the Israelites reach Marah they complain about the undrinkability, so Moses complains to Yahweh, and Yahweh responds by showing Moses a certain piece of wood, which Moses then throws into the water, making it sweet and fit to drink.

The text goes on to state that in this location, a decree and a law were made by Yahweh for the Israelites, and that Yahweh tested them. However, according to textual scholars following the documentary hypothesis, the narrative concerning the bitter water comes from the Jahwist account, while the mention of law and testing is actually part of the Elohist account; textual scholars view this as the Elohist version of the naming of Massah, since the triconsonantal root of the Hebrew word used for tested here (נסה) is very similar to that for Massah (מסה), and the later explanation of Massah connects the name to the same root (נסה). The Talmud argues that the text is referring to three additional laws being added to the Noahide laws, namely that tribunals should be created, children should obey parents, and that the Sabbath should be observed. In the biblical text, Yahweh also states that he would not bring any diseases upon the Israelites if they obey Yahweh's decrees; biblical scholars regard this as a redactional addition, and appears to be an attempt to distract the reader from the implication in the previous verse that laws were given by Yahweh before Sinai was reached.

== Speculations about the location ==
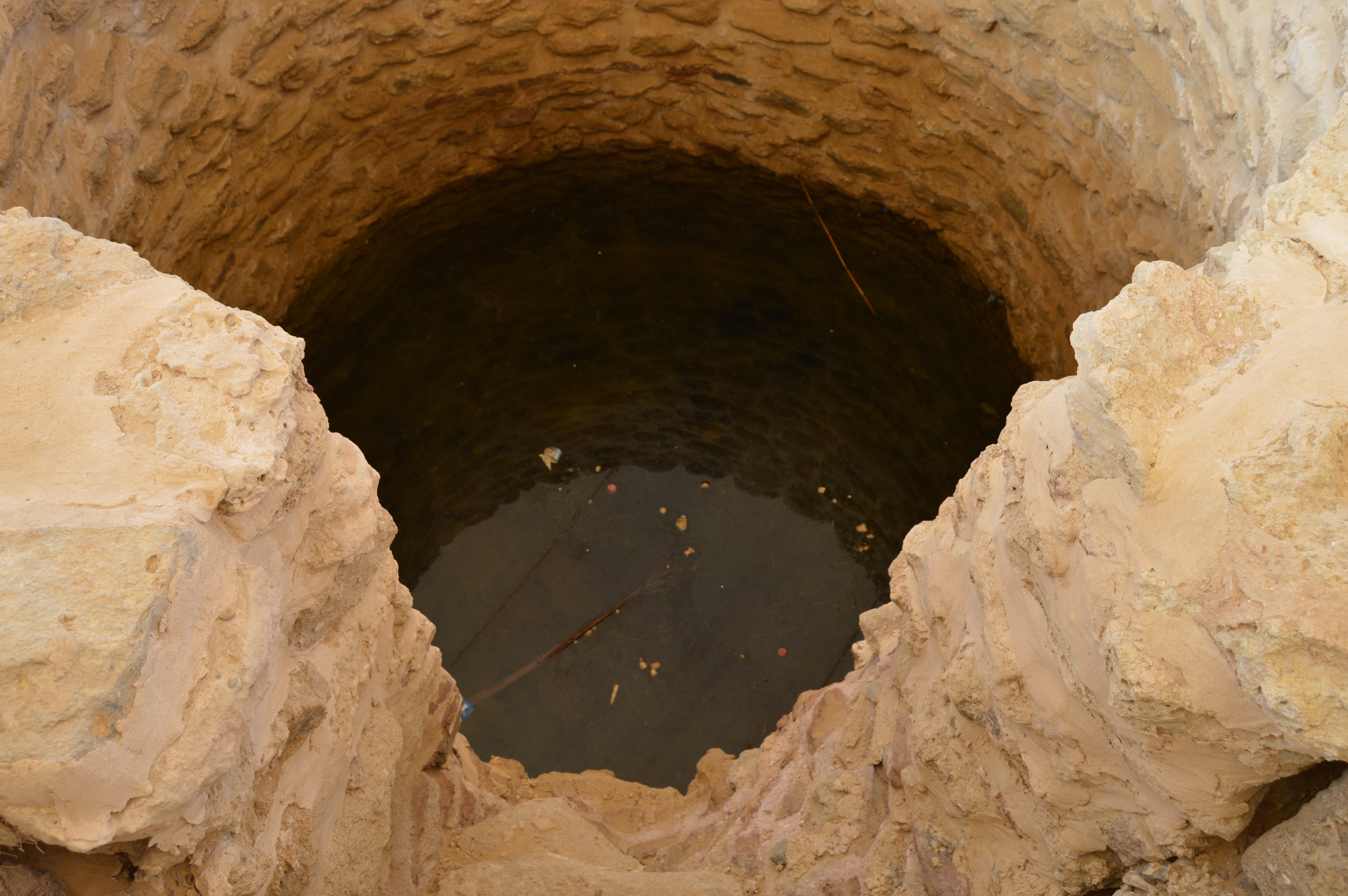
Well in the desert

According to the Book of Exodus, the Israelites reached Marah after travelling in the Wilderness of Shur, while according to the stations list in the Book of Numbers, the Israelites had reached Marah after travelling in the Wilderness of Etham; both biblical sources state that the Israelites were at Marah before reaching Elim. Textual scholars regard the geographic information as deriving from two different versions of the same independent list of stations, one version being the list which takes up a chapter of the Book of Numbers, and the other version being slotted around the Marah narrative and around other narratives in the Book of Exodus and Book of Numbers, as appropriate; according to this view, the latter version of this list would originally have read ...and they went out into the wilderness of Shur; and they went three days in the wilderness, and found no water, then they came to Elim, where were twelve wells of water, ..., without mentioning Marah.

The exact location of Marah is uncertain, as are the positions of Etham, Shur, and Elim; the identification of these locations is heavily dependent on the identification of the Biblical Mount Sinai. Traditionally, Sinai was equated with one of the mountains at the south of the Sinai Peninsula leading to the identification of Marah as Ain Hawarah, a salty spring roughly 47 miles southeast from Suez. Some scholars have proposed to identify Marah as Bir el-Mura, based on the fact that the Arabic name is a cognate of Hebrew one.

== In popular culture ==
In the classic 1970 mystical film, El Topo, by Alejandro Jodorowsky, the protagonist and his female companion approach a river and the woman attempts to drink from it, only to find out that it is bitter in taste. The protagonist tells her that Moses found water in the desert but that the people were unable to drink it because it was bitter and so they called the water Marah. The protagonist then stirs the water with a tree branch, the woman drinks again and this time it is sweet. He then tells her, "I shall call you Marah, because you are bitter like water".

== See also ==
- Bitter Lakes
- Marib
- Massah
- Meribah

== Sources ==
- The Torah - A Modern Commentary by Gunther W. Plaut, pp. 495; Union of American Hebrew Congregations, 1981, New York.
