= Massah and Meribah =

Biblical location

Massah (Hebrew: מַסָּה) and Meribah (Hebrew: מְרִיבָה, also spelled "Mirabah") are place names found in the Hebrew Bible. The Israelites are said to have travelled through Massah and Meribah during the Exodus, although the continuous list of visited stations in Numbers 33 does not mention this. It is debated whether Massah and Meribah were two names for the same place.

== Same or different locations ==
There is a debate about if Massah and Meribah are two names for the same place. The dispute arises from ambiguities of different biblical passages. Some, like Exodus 17:7, suggest that they could be the same. Another, in the Blessing of Moses (Deuteronomy 33:8) seems to imply that they are distinct. Massah and Meribah are also referred to in several other places in the Bible.

The general view is that the two names refer to the same location. Textual scholars attribute the difference to the different sources from which these passages derive. The Septuagint, Targums, and the Vulgate deal with the issue by regarding the Meribah in the Book of Numbers as simply being a common noun, rather than a place-name, rendering Me Meribath-Kadesh as the waters of strife in Kadesh rather than as the waters of Meribah in Kadesh.

== Events ==
The Biblical text mentions two very similar episodes that both occur at a place named Meribah. The episode recounted in Exodus 17 features the Israelites quarreling with Moses about the lack of water, and Moses rebuking the Israelites for testing Yahweh; verse 7 states that it was on this account that the place gained the name Massah, meaning testing, and the name Meribah meaning quarreling. This narrative states that on account of their thirst, the Israelites grumbled against Moses, so Moses, in fear for his life, appeals to Yahweh; the narrative continues with Yahweh telling Moses to walk ahead of the others and strike the rock at Horeb with his rod, and when Moses does this, it causes the rock to expel water.

The episode recounted by the Book of Numbers features the Israelites quarreling with Moses and Aaron about the lack of water and food crops; the text states that Moses and Aaron responded by consulting Yahweh at the Tabernacle door, while prostrating themselves, and that Yahweh told them to take the rod, and speak to a particular rock while the people are gathered together in view of it. The narrative continues with Moses following the instructions to take Aaron's staff and to gather the Israelites, but instead of speaking to the rock, which Yahweh had stated would result in water flowing from it, Moses speaks to the crowd and strikes the rock, doing so twice, resulting in a strong flow of water.

Some textual scholars regard the two accounts as different versions of the same events at Meribah, with the version in the Book of Exodus being from the JE source, and the version in the Book of Numbers being from the Priestly Source; the latter account, like the Priestly Source in general, is considered to be an attempt to supplant the JE version of the narrative, which doesn't treat Aaron as being as important as the Aaronid writer of the Priestly Source would have liked.

According to these textual scholars, the JE account in Exodus of the events at Massah and Meribah is spliced together from two earlier source texts, namely the Jahwist and Elohist texts. Textual scholars regard the Jahwist text and Elohist text as both having an account of the naming of Massah, and both having an account of provision of water, but with the accounts being spliced together in a non-straightforward manner; where the combined text reports events at Massah and Meribah, textual scholars believe that the mention of a quarrel, the testing of Yahweh, and the naming of Massah, are all part of the Jahwist text, while the extraction of water from a stone, and the naming of Meribah, are part of the Elohist text. The Elohist account of water being provided at Meribah (מריבה) is seen by secular Biblical scholars as a parallel of the Jahwist's account of the provision of water at Marah (מרה); in the Marah narrative is mention of Yahweh testing the Israelites, which textual scholars attribute to the Elohist account, and regard as the parallel of the Jahwist's account of the naming of Massah after the testing of Yahweh by the Israelites.

=== The Death of Moses and Aaron ===
In the account in the Book of Numbers, but not the account in the Book of Exodus, after the water is produced, Yahweh tells Moses and Aaron that they did not trust him sufficiently to honour him, and as a consequence both Moses and Aaron would die before entering Canaan. It is unclear what, exactly, merited their punishment, though the text does make clear that it was Moses alone who spoke to the people and struck the rock; biblical scholars regard this as an example of the Priestly Source's usual subtle denigration of Moses, the hero of the Shiloh priesthood (which rivaled the Aaronids). One possible reason for the punishment is that Moses had struck the rock twice, rather than just speaking to it as he had been told to do; another possibility is that he had rashly addressed the Israelites by the phrase you rebels. Yet another reason may be that Moses attributes the miracle to his own power and fails to mention the Lord. According to Deuteronomy, which textual scholars attribute to a writer who was pro-Moses and anti-Aaron, the punishment was due to the lack of trust in Yahweh that had been exhibited by the Israelites, rather than by Moses.

=== Historicity ===
Some Biblical scholars see the narrative about Massah and Meribah as having originated as aetiological myths seeking to justify their names.

== Geographical location ==
According to Exodus, Massah was one of the stops on the route taken by the Israeite's during their sojourn after the Exodus from Egypt (Exodus 17). Massah is elsewhere named as one of the twelve sons of Ishmael (Genesis 25:14), who inhabited the region of northwestern Arabia, located near Tayma. This is corroborated by some extra-biblical sources, especially Assyrian inscriptions from the time of Tiglath-Pileser III.

== See also ==
- Marah
