= Joshua 13 =

Book of Joshua, chapter 13

- ← chapter 12 chapter 14 →
- The pages containing the Book of Joshua in Leningrad Codex (1008 CE).
- Book: Book of Joshua
- Hebrew Bible part: Nevi'im
- Order in the Hebrew part: 1
- Category: Former Prophets
- Christian Bible part: Old Testament
- Order in the Christian part: 6

Joshua 13 is the thirteenth chapter of the Book of Joshua in the Hebrew Bible or in the Old Testament of the Christian Bible. According to Jewish tradition the book was attributed to Joshua, with additions by the high priests Eleazar and Phinehas, but modern scholars view it as part of the Deuteronomistic History, which spans the books of Deuteronomy to 2 Kings, attributed to nationalistic and devotedly Yahwistic writers during the time of the reformer Judean king Josiah in 7th century BCE. This chapter records the list of land still to be conquered and the land allotments for the tribes Reuben, Gad and half of the Manasseh (east), a part of a section comprising Joshua 13:1–21:45 about the Israelites allotting the land of Canaan.

== Text ==
This chapter was originally written in the Hebrew language. It is divided into 33 verses.

=== Textual witnesses ===
Some early manuscripts containing the text of this chapter in Hebrew are of the Masoretic Text tradition, which includes the Codex Cairensis (895), Aleppo Codex (10th century), and Codex Leningradensis (1008).

Extant ancient manuscripts of a translation into Koine Greek known as the Septuagint (originally was made in the last few centuries BCE) include Codex Vaticanus (B; $\mathfrak{G}$^{B}; 4th century) and Codex Alexandrinus (A; $\mathfrak{G}$^{A}; 5th century). (Note: The whole book of Joshua is missing from the extant Codex Sinaiticus.)

=== Old Testament references ===
- Joshua 13:1–7: Judges 1:1–7
- Joshua 13:8–14: Numbers 32:1–42; Deuteronomy 3:12–22

== Analysis ==
The narrative of Israelites allotting the land of Canaan comprising verses 13:1 to 21:45 of the Book of Joshua and has the following outline:

A. Preparations for Distributing the Land (13:1-14:15)

1. Joshua Directed to Distribute the West Jordan Inheritance (13:1-7)
2. The East Jordan Inheritance (13:8-33)

a. The East Jordan (13:8-14)
b. Reuben (13:15-23)
c. Gad (13:24-28)
d. East Manasseh (13:29-31)
e. Summary (13:32-33)

3. Summary of the West Jordan Inheritance (14:1-5)
4. Caleb's Inheritance (14:6-15)

B. The Allotment for Judah (15:1-63)
C. The Allotment for Joseph (16:1-17:18)
D. Land Distribution at Shiloh (18:1-19:51)
E. Levitical Distribution and Conclusion (20:1-21:45)

== The command to allot the Land (13:1–7) ==
After the completion of the conquest narrative, this passage starts the major section concerning the allocation of territory to the tribes (Joshua 13–21). The command to Joshua (verse 1) recalls other challenges to Israel in the book, with promise and warning at the same time (23:16; 24). It is followed by the outline of the land not yet conquered, covering three areas:

1. the Philistine lands from the border with Egypt in the south to the five Philistine cities in the coastal plain north of it (verse 3);
2. the Phoenician coast (verse 4), and
3. the mountains of Lebanon (verses 5–6).

Now Joshua's task is to divide the land in Cisjordan (v. 7), as the Transjordanian land have already been allotted.

=== Verses 2–3 ===
^{2}This is the land that yet remains: all the regions of the Philistines, and all those of the Geshurites ^{3}(from the Shihor, which is east of Egypt, northward to the boundary of Ekron, it is counted as Canaanite; there are five rulers of the Philistines, those of Gaza, Ashdod, Ashkelon, Gath, and Ekron), and those of the Avvim,

- "Philistines": This is the first report in the book of this group of people in the land of Canaan, and Israel unconditionally promised to expel them from the Shephelah. Joshua never fought directly with the Philistines, because during the period of his conquest the area of Philistine cities (Ekron, Isdud, Ascalon, Gaza and Gath) might still largely be occupied by the "Anakim". The first clash of Israelites with the Philistines occurred briefly in the time of Shamgar (Judges 3:31). The Philistines definitely established as a major force in Canaan during the time of Samson (Judges 16:21–23) and later.

== The settling of Transjordan (13:8–33) ==
The allotment of the Transjordan (land east of Jordan River) prefaces the section about the distribution of the Cisjordan (land west of the Jordan), with more abbreviated lists of cities than the parallel in Numbers 32:34–38, but including other materials (e.g. Numbers 31:8 for verses 21–22; Deuteronomy 18:1 for verses 14, 33). Moses led the conquest in Transjordan (verses 12, 21), so he could 'give' the land as 'inheritance' (verses 8, 14-15, 24, 29, 33), and this continues to chapter 14 (verses 3-4, 9, 12), until finally Joshua is the one who 'gives for an inheritance' (14:13). This Transjordan narrative is therefore to affirm the unity of Moses' and Joshua's work, and demonstrates the unity of all tribes of Israel. The division of the large tribe of Joseph into two, Ephraim and Manasseh (14:3–4), explains why the tribe of Levi did not receive land of its own (verse 14, 33; their compensation is elaborated in Joshua 21), so the twelvefold character of Israel is maintained. Although Moses and Joshua distribute the land, it will be an 'inheritance', as its ultimate giver is the God of Israel.

=== Verse 22 ===
Balaam also, the son of Beor, the one who practiced divination, was killed with the sword by the people of Israel among the rest of their slain.

- "Balaam": was hired by Balak, king of Moab, to curse Israel, but he committed to the word of God (after receiving warnings) to bless the Israelites (Numbers 22–24), but he continued to practice divination and gave advice leading to Israel getting the curse in Baal-Peor (Numbers 31), so his killing is to recompense his part to the incident.

== See also ==
- Ammon
- Amorites
- Aphek
- Arnon
- Aroer
- Asdod
- Ashdoth-pisgah
- Ashtaroth
- Avvite
- Baalgad
- Bethbaalmeon
- Balaam
- Bamoth-baal
- Bashan
- Betharam
- Beth-jeshimoth
- Beth-nimrah
- Beth-peor
- Beor
- Canaanite
- Chinnereth
- Debir
- Dibon
- Edrei
- Ekron
- Ascalon
- Evi
- Gath
- Gaza
- Geshur
- Gilead
- Hamath
- Heshbon
- Hur
- Jair
- Jazer
- Jordan River
- Kedemoth
- Kirjathaim
- Korban
- Lebanon
- Levite
- Maachathite
- Machir
- Mahanaim
- Mearah
- Medeba
- Mephaath
- Midian
- Misrephoth-maim
- Mount Hermon
- Og
- Philistia
- Rabbah
- Reba
- Rekem
- Salcah
- Sidonians
- Sihon
- Sihor
- Succoth
- Zaphon
- Zareth-shahar
- Zur
- Related Bible parts: Numbers 21; Deuteronomy 2, Deuteronomy 3; Joshua 1, Joshua 10, Joshua 11

== Sources ==
- Beal, Lissa M. Wray (2019). Longman, Tremper III; McKnight, Scot (eds.). Joshua. The Story of God Bible Commentary. Zondervan Academic. ISBN 978-0310490838.
- Coogan, Michael David (2007). Coogan, Michael David; Brettler, Marc Zvi; Newsom, Carol Ann; Perkins, Pheme (eds.). The New Oxford Annotated Bible with the Apocryphal/Deuterocanonical Books: New Revised Standard Version, Issue 48 (Augmented 3rd ed.). Oxford University Press. ISBN 978-0195288810.
- Firth, David G. (2021). Joshua: Evangelical Biblical Theology Commentary. Evangelical Biblical Theology Commentary (EBTC) (illustrated ed.). Lexham Press. ISBN 9781683594406.
- Halley, Henry H. (1965). Halley's Bible Handbook: an abbreviated Bible commentary (24th (revised) ed.). Zondervan Publishing House. ISBN 0-310-25720-4.
- Harstad, Adolph L. (2004). Joshua. Concordia Publishing House. ISBN 978-0570063193.
- Hayes, Christine (2015). Introduction to the Bible. Yale University Press. ISBN 978-0300188271.
- Hubbard, Robert L (2009). Joshua. The NIV Application Commentary. Zondervan. ISBN 978-0310209348.
- McConville, Gordon (2007). "9. Joshua". In Barton, John; Muddiman, John (eds.). The Oxford Bible Commentary (first (paperback) ed.). Oxford University Press. pp. 158–176. ISBN 978-0199277186.
- Rösel, Hartmut N. (2011). Joshua. Historical commentary on the Old Testament. Vol. 6 (illustrated ed.). Peeters. ISBN 978-9042925922.
- Webb, Barry G. (2012). The Book of Judges. New International Commentary on the Old Testament. Eerdmans Publishing Company. ISBN 9780802826282.
- Würthwein, Ernst (1995). The Text of the Old Testament. Translated by Rhodes, Erroll F. Grand Rapids, MI: Wm. B. Eerdmans. ISBN 0-8028-0788-7.
