= Balaam =

Prophet in the Book of Numbers

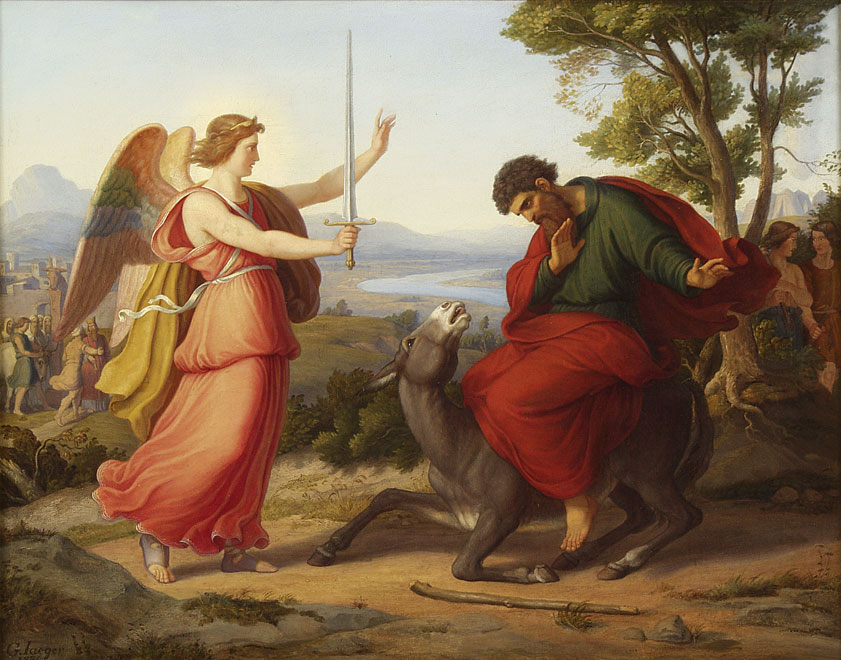
Balaam and the angel, painting from Gustav Jaeger, 1836

Balaam (/ˈbeɪlæm/; Hebrew: בִּלְעָם, romanized: Bīlʿām; Old Aramaic: 𐤁𐤋𐤏𐤌, romanized: Bilʿām), son of Beor, was, according to the Bible, a gentile prophet and diviner who lived in Pethor, a place identified with the ancient city of Pitru, thought to have been located between the region of Iraq and northern Syria in what is now southeastern Turkey. According to chapters 22–24 of the Book of Numbers, he was hired by King Balak of Moab to curse Israel, but instead he blessed the Israelites, as dictated by God. Subsequently, the plan to entice the Israelites into idol worship and sexual immorality is attributed to him. Balaam is also mentioned in the Book of Micah, the Second Epistle of Peter, the Book of Jude, and the Book of Revelation.

In rabbinic literature, Balaam is portrayed as a non-Israelite prophet with powers comparable to Moses but is often depicted negatively for his attempts to curse Israel, his role in leading them to sin, and his eventual execution. The Talmud emphasizes his importance by stating that Moses authored not only the Torah but also the section relating to Balaam (Bava Batra 14b).

In Josephus, Philo, and Christian sources, Balaam is recognized for his exceptional divinatory abilities but is criticized for his moral failings, including greed and corruption. The New Testament portrays Balaam as a symbol of greed, particularly in Revelation 2:14, which accuses him of instructing Balak to lead the Israelites into sin by encouraging idolatry and sexual immorality. Islamic tradition does not mention Balaam by name in the Quran but identifies him with the figure in Surah Al-A’raf 7:175–176, who received divine knowledge but succumbed to worldly desires, leading to his downfall and depiction as a panting dog.

The Deir Alla inscription, dating to around 840–760 BC, describes visions of Balaam, son of Beor, and portrays him as receiving messages from multiple deities rather than Yahweh, making it potentially the earliest extra-biblical reference to a biblical figure and the oldest known West Semitic alphabetic text.

== Hebrew Tanakh ==
The main story of Balaam occurs during the sojourn of the Israelites in the plains of Moab, east of the Jordan River, at the close of forty years of wandering, shortly before the death of Moses and the crossing of the Jordan. The Israelites have already defeated two kings in Transjordan: Sihon, king of the Amorites, and Og, king of Bashan. Balak, king of Moab, consequently becomes alarmed and sends elders of Midian and his Moabite messengers, to Balaam, son of Beor, to induce him to come and curse Israel. Balaam's location, Pethor, which is now located in the region of northern Syria and southeastern Turkey is simply given as "which is by the river of the land of the children of his people" in the Masoretic Text and the Septuagint. The Samaritan Pentateuch, Vulgate, and Peshitta all identify his land as Ammon.

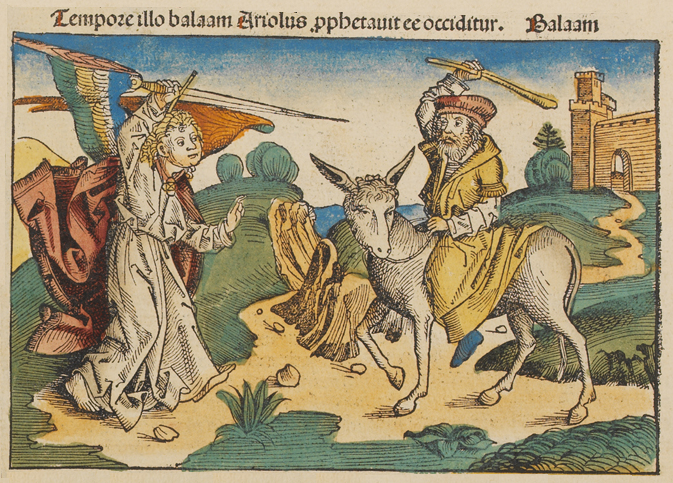
Balaam and the angel Nuremberg Chronicle (1493)

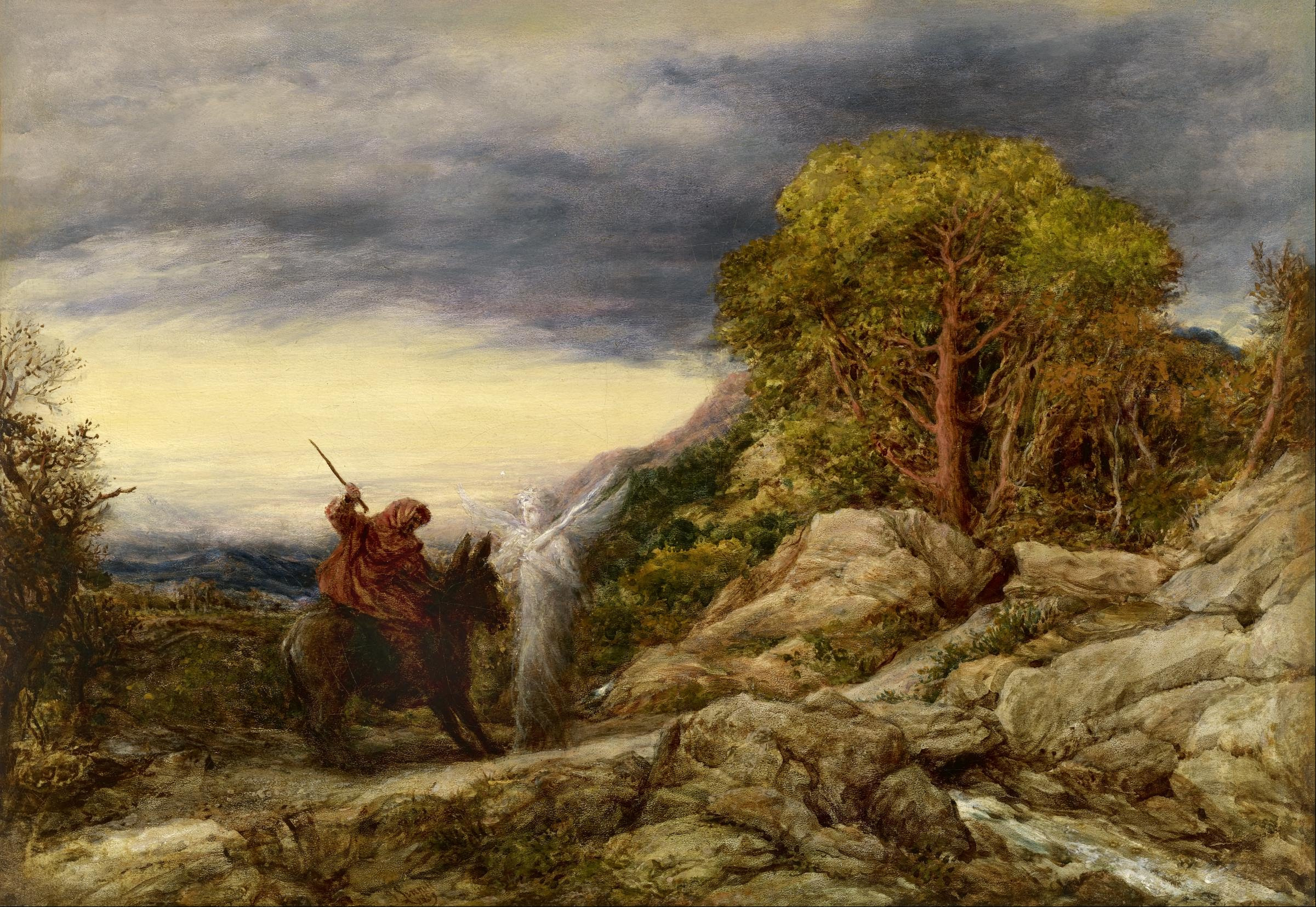
The Prophet Balaam and the Angel by John Linnell (1859)

Balaam sends back word that he can only do what Yahweh commands, and God has, via a nocturnal dream, told him not to go. Balak consequently sends higher-ranking priests and offers Balaam honours; Balaam continues to press God, and God finally permits him to go but with instructions to say only what he commands. Balaam then sets out in the morning with the princes of Moab. God becomes angry that he went and sends the Angel of the Lord (Numbers 22:22) to prevent him. At first, the angel is seen only by the donkey Balaam is riding, which tries to avoid the angel. After Balaam starts punishing the donkey for refusing to move, it is miraculously given the power to speak to Balaam (Numbers 22:28) and says, "What have I done to you, that you have struck me these three times?" At this point, Balaam is allowed to see the angel, who informs him that the donkey's turning away from the messenger is the only reason the angel did not kill Balaam. Balaam immediately repents, but is told to go on.

Balak meets with Balaam at Kirjat Huzoth, and they go to Bamoth-Baal (the "high places of Baal"), and offer sacrifices on seven altars, leading to Balaam being given a prophecy by Yahweh, which he speaks to Balak. However, the prophecy blesses Israel; Balak remonstrates, but Balaam reminds him that he can only speak the words put in his mouth, so Balak takes him to another "high place" at Pisgah, to try again. Building another seven altars here, and making sacrifices on each, Balaam provides another prophecy blessing Israel.

Balaam finally gets taken by a now very frustrated Balak to Peor, and, after the seven sacrifices there, decides not to "seek enchantments" but instead looks upon the Israelites from the peak. The Spirit of God comes upon Balaam and he delivers a third positive prophecy concerning Israel. Balak's anger rises to the point where he threatens Balaam, but Balaam merely offers a prediction of fate. Balaam then looks upon the Kenites, and Amalekites and offers two more predictions of their fates. Balak and Balaam then go to their respective homes.

Later, Numbers 25:1–9 describes how Israel engaged in the Heresy of Peor. Numbers 31:16 blames this on Balaam's advice and because of his culpability in the incident, which resulted in deadly divine judgements against the Israelites who participated, he was eventually killed in a retaliatory battle against Midian in Numbers 31:8.

Deuteronomy 23:3–6 summarises these incidents, and further states that the Ammonites were associated with the Moabites. Joshua, in his farewell speech, also makes reference to it. With God's protection taken from him, Balaam is later listed among the Midianites who were killed in revenge for the "matter of Peor". Joshua 13:22 records that Balaam died "by the sword" during a battle for the Reubenite occupation of Midianite land.

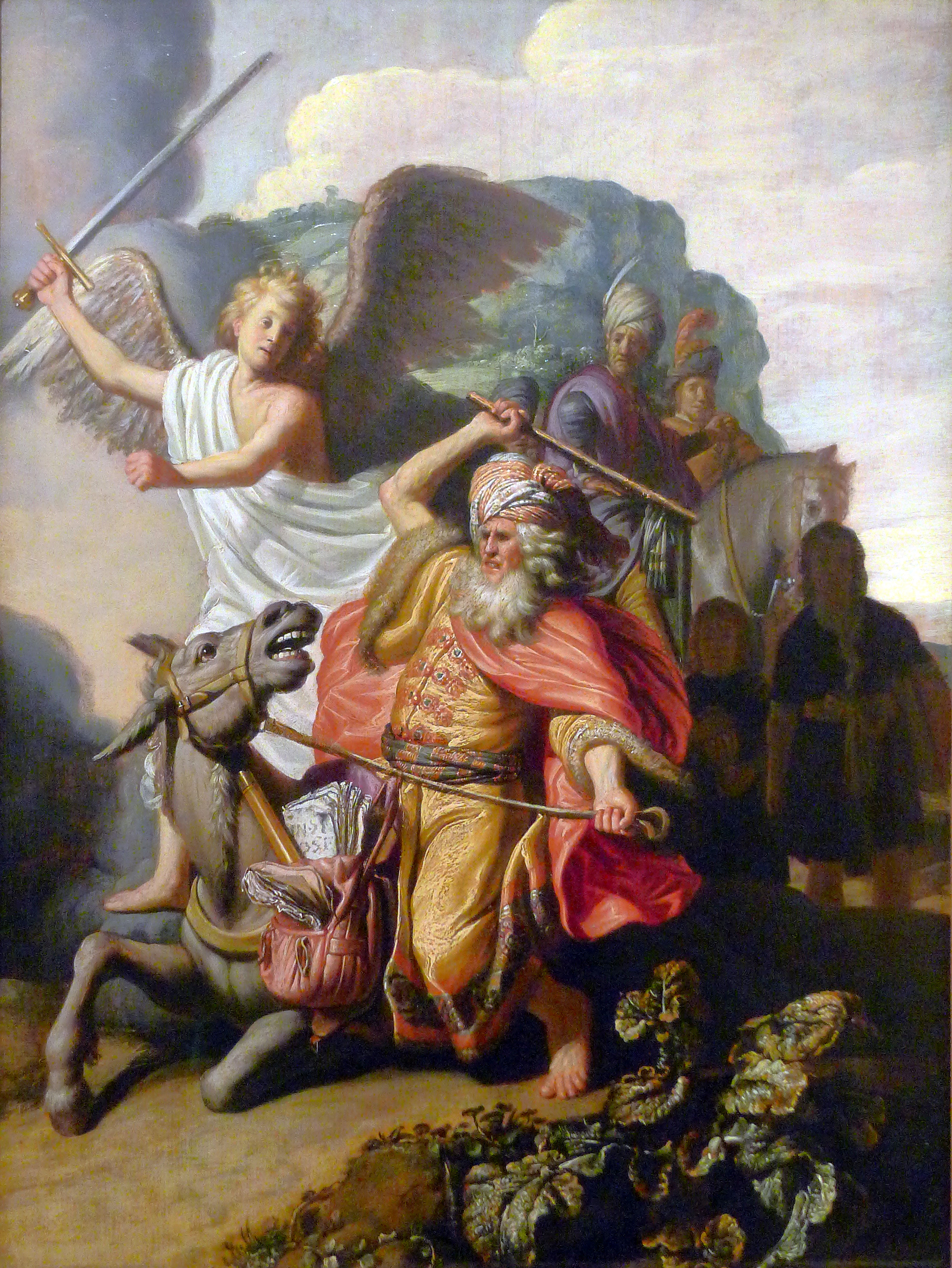
Balaam and the Ass, by Rembrandt van Rijn, 1626

In total, Balaam's prophecies consist of seven (Hebrew) poems:

- The first, Numbers 23:7–10, prophesies the unique exaltation of the Kingdom of Israel, and its countless numbers.
- The second, Numbers 23:18–24, celebrates the moral virtue of Israel, its monarchy, and its military conquests.
- The third, Numbers 24:3–9, celebrates the glory and conquests of Israel's monarchy.
- The fourth, Numbers 24:14–19, prophesies the coming of a king who will conquer Edom and Moab.
- The fifth, Numbers 24:20, concerns the ruins of Amalek.
- The sixth, Numbers 24:21–22, concerns the destruction of the Kenites by Assyria.
- The seventh, Numbers 24:23–24, concerns "ships of Kittim" coming from the west to attack Assyria and Eber.

The poems fall into three groups. The first group consists of two poems which characteristically start immediately. The third group of three poems also start immediately, but are much shorter. The second group, however, consists of two poems which both start:

Balaam the son of Beor hath said, and the man whose eyes are open hath said: He hath said, which heard the words of God, which saw the vision of the Almighty, falling into a trance, but having his eyes open ...

=== Biblical criticism ===
In the oldest Biblical traditions about the seer, he is viewed "unequivocally positively". Of Balaam's three groups of poems, the documentary hypothesis argued that the first and third groups originated within the Elohist text, whereas the second group belonged to the Jahwist. Thus the Elohist describes Balaam giving two blessings, making sacrifices on seven altars, at the high places of Baal, before each, then deciding not to "seek enchantments" after the third set of sacrifices, but to "set his face upon the wilderness", which Balak views as a third blessing, and so Balaam then gives the three final predictions of fate. Conversely, in the Jahwist source, Balaam arrives, the spirit of God comes upon him, and he delivers a blessing and a prophecy in succession.

Agag, mentioned in the third poem, is described as a great king, which does not correspond to the king of the Amalekites who was named Agag, and described in 1 Samuel 15, since that description considers Amalek to be small and obscure. While the Masoretic Text of the poem uses the word Agag, the Septuagint, other Greek versions, and the Samaritan Pentateuch all have Gog. These names are consequently considered textual corruptions, and Og has been suggested as the original.

The final three poems do not refer to Israel or Moab and are thus considered unusual since they seem to have little relevance to the narrative. It is thought that they may have been added to bring the number of poems up to five if inserted into the Elohist source or up to seven if only inserted once JE was constructed. While the sixth poem refers to Assyria, it is uncertain whether it is a historical reference to ancient Nineveh or a prophecy, which some religious commentators consider refers to the Seleucid Empire, which also took the name "Assyria". The seventh is also ambiguous and may either be a reference to the Sea Peoples or, in the view of some religious commentators, to the conquest of the Achaemenid Empire by Alexander the Great.

The redactor used word association of the "summit of Peor" in Numbers 22-24 to recount and place the Balaam story before the unrelated Numbers 25 event where the Israelites are incited to worship "Baal of Peor" by Moabites. Michael B. Shepherd then indicates that both narratives are combined to create a new incident in Numbers 31, where it is instead Midianites who instigate the idolatry and Balaam is directly named as an antagonist. Deuteronomy 23 attempts to harmonize the traditions by having Yahweh turn Balaam's curse into a blessing, rather than Balaam originally himself blessing Israel, and Ammonites are included alongside Moabites in provoking Balaam to act. In Joshua 24 there is a similar endeavour to reconcile the narratives, but the situation remains conflicted, as it mentions that Balaam did in fact bless them.

In the view of some schools of textual criticism, the narrative, excepting the episode involving the donkey, is simply a framework invented to be able to insert much older poems. The incorporated tale of Balaam and his donkey is considered to be in the genre of fable, and to have been from later after he was already vilified. Robert Karl Gnuse believes there is possibly ancient Greek influences in the folktale of Balaam, due to the narrative similarities with that of Achilles and his talking horse Xanthus.

Balaam's fourth oracle of the star and sceptre is said to have been influential on the Damascus Document, and cited as well in the War Scroll, Qumran 4QTestimonia and 4Q541. However, the Numbers 24 prophecy was not attributed to Balaam in the Damascus Document due to his negative portrayals.

== Deir Alla inscription ==
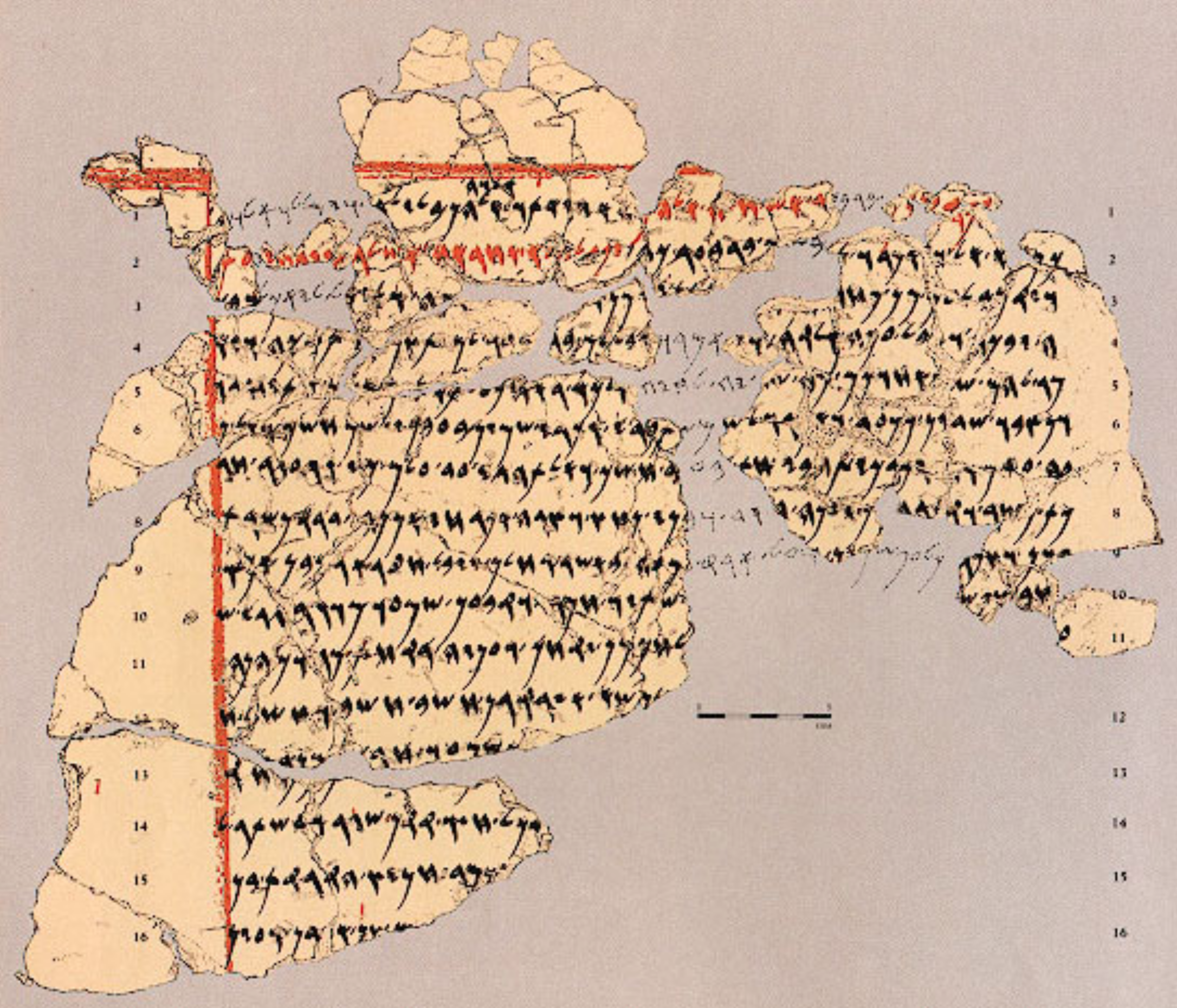
Drawing of fragments of the Deir Alla inscription

In 1967, at Deir Alla, Jordan, archaeologists found an inscription with a story relating visions of the seer of the gods Balaam, son of Be'or, the same name appearing as that of a prophet in the Bible. In both the inscription and the Bible, Balaam is a prophet whose utterances determine the fate of nations. However, other details of the stories are different. According to the inscription, Balaam wakes up weeping and tells his people that the gods appeared to him in the night telling him about a goddess threatening to destroy the land. She is to cover the sky and reduce the world to complete darkness. In contrast with the biblical account where Balaam receives prophecies from Yahweh, the inscription associates Balaam with multiple deities (Ashtar, a god named Shgr, and Shadday gods and goddesses). If this inscription refers to Balaam mentioned in the Book of Numbers, Balaam is the earliest biblical figure identified in extra-biblical source.

The Oxford Handbook of Biblical Studies describes it as "the oldest example of a book in a West Semitic language written with the alphabet, and the oldest piece of Aramaic literature". The inscription is datable to ca. 840–760 BCE; it was painted in red and black inks, apparently to emphasize the text, on fragments of a plastered wall: 119 pieces of inked plaster were recovered. Meindert Dijkstra suggests that "the reticence of OT scholarship to take account of the text may be attributable to its damaged state, the difficulty of reconstructing and reading it, and the many questions it raises of script, language, literary form and religious content".

Archaeologist Israel Finkelstein argued in 2019 that the Deir Alla inscription transformed scholars' view of Balaam from an "'invented' character" to being a "historical figure" like Balak.

== In rabbinic literature ==
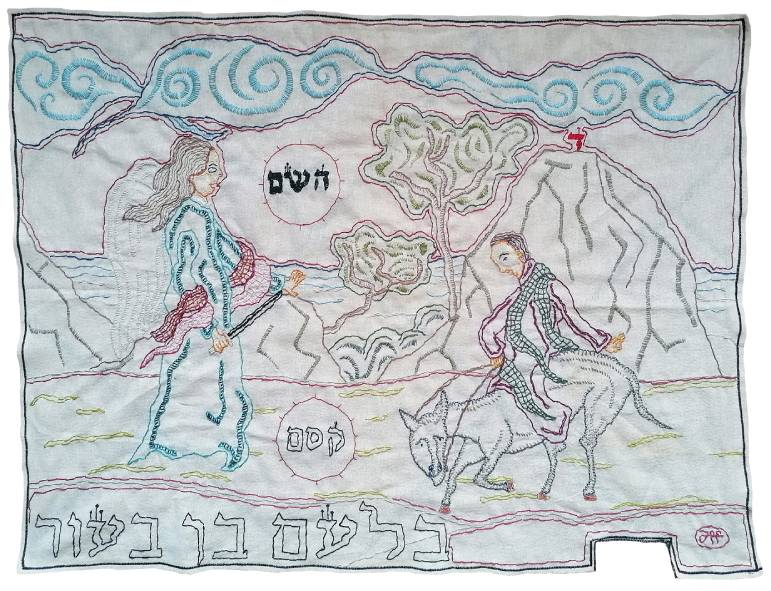
בלעם בן בעור – Artwork by esoteric artist Filippo Biagioli

In rabbinic literature Balaam is represented as one of seven non-Israelite prophets; the other six being Beor (Balaam's father), Job, and Job's four friends. In this literature, Balaam gradually acquired a position among the non-Jews, which was exalted as much as that of Moses among the Jews; at first being a mere interpreter of dreams, but later becoming a magician, until finally the spirit of prophecy descended upon him.

According to a negative view of Balaam in the Talmud, Balaam possessed the gift of being able to ascertain the exact moment during which God is angry—a gift bestowed upon no other creature. Balaam's intention was to curse the Israelites at this moment of wrath, and thus cause God himself to destroy them; but God purposely restrained his anger in order to baffle the wicked prophet and to save the nation from extermination. The Talmud also recounts a more positive view of Balaam, stating that when the Torah was given to Israel, a mighty voice shook the foundations of the earth, so much so that all kings trembled, and in their consternation turned to Balaam, inquiring whether this upheaval of nature portended a second deluge; the prophet assured them that what they heard was the voice of God, giving the sacred law to the Israelites.

According to Jewish legend, Balaam was made this powerful in order to prevent the non-Jewish tribes from saying: "If we had only had our own Moses, we would be as pious as the Jews." Balaam is included in the list of persons born circumcised along with Moses.

In rabbinical literature the epithet rasha, translating as the wicked one, is often attached to the name of Balaam. Balaam is pictured as blind in one eye and lame in one foot, and his disciples (followers) are distinguished by three morally corrupt qualities: an evil eye, a haughty bearing, and a greedy spirit.

Due to his behavior with the Midianites, the Rabbis interpret Balaam as responsible for the behavior during the Heresy of Peor, which they consider to have been unchastity, and consequently the death of 24,000 victims of the plague which God sent as punishment. When Balaam saw that he could not curse the children of Israel, the Rabbis assert that he advised Balak, as a last resort, to tempt the Hebrew nation to immoral acts and, through these, to the worship of Baal-peor. The God of the Hebrews, adds Balaam, hates lewdness; and severe chastisement must follow.

The Rabbis, playing on the name Balaam, call him "Belo 'Am" (without people; that is, without a share with the people in the world to come), or "Billa' 'Am" (one that ruined a people); and this hostility against his memory finds its climax in the dictum that whenever one discovers a feature of wickedness or disgrace in his life, one should preach about it. In the process of killing Balaam (Numbers 31:8), all four legal methods of execution—stoning, burning, decapitating, and strangling—were employed. He met his death at the age of 33, and it is stated that he had no portion in the world to come. The book devotes a special section to the history of the prophet discussing why God has taken away the power of prophecy from the Gentiles. The Talmud states that "Moses wrote his book and the portion of Balaam", regarding this passage as separate from the rest of the Torah in terms of topic or style, but united in authorship.

Some have suggested that in Sanhedrin 106b and Giṭtin 57a Balaam may be likened to Jesus. Balaam's father Beor was a son of Laban. The Book of Jasher reports that Balaam's sons were Jannes and Jambres.

Balaam's exclamation, "How good are your tents, O Jacob, your tabernacles, O Israel!", was taken by later generations of Jews as the basis of the liturgical prayer Ma Tovu.

== In Josephus, Philo, and Christian sources ==
Balaam is mentioned in several places in the New Testament, where he is cited as a type of avarice; for example in the Book of Revelation 2:14 describes false teachers at Pergamum who held the "teaching of Balaam, who taught Balak to cast a stumbling-block before the children of Israel, to eat things sacrificed to idols, and to commit fornication". Balaam has attracted much interest, alike from Jews, Christians, and Muslims. Josephus paraphrases the story more so, and speaks of Balaam as the best prophet of his time, but with a disposition ill-adapted to resist temptation. Philo describes him as a great magician in the Life of Moses; elsewhere he speaks of "the sophist Balaam, being", i.e. symbolizing "a vain crowd of contrary and warring opinions" and again as "a vain people", both phrases being based on a mistaken etymology of the name Balaam.

A man also named Balaam also figures as an example of a false prophet motivated by greed or avarice in both 2 Peter 2:15 and in Jude 1:11. This Balaam is listed as the son of Bosor or Bezer, which is usually identified as Beor. Some scholars claim that Bezer was the Aramaic pronunciation of Beor, others hold that the author was attempting to play off the Hebrew word basar or "flesh" to insult Balaam, while another is that they were summarizing the story from memory. Later Jewish tradition similarly played with Balaam's name to call him corrupt and imply bestiality. Still other authors hold that Bezer and Beor are distinct, while still identifying the Balaams of the Old and New Testaments, claiming that Beor is Balaam's father and Bezer is Balaam's home town.

The story is also referred to in chapter 10 of 2 Meqabyan, a book considered canonical in the Ethiopian Orthodox Tewahedo Church.

In his commentary on Matthew's Gospel, Dale Allison associates the magi who visited the infant Jesus (Matthew 2) with Balaam, in that both Balaam and the magi were "from the east": thus "Matthew's magi are Balaam's successors".

== In the Quran ==
No clear reference is made to Balaam in the Qur'an. However, the commentators argue that he is the one to whom the following text is referring:

And relate to them ˹O Prophet˺ the story of the one to whom We gave Our signs, but he abandoned them, so Satan took hold of him, and he became a deviant.
If We had willed, We would have elevated him with Our signs, but he clung to this life—following his evil desires. His example is that of a dog: if you chase it away, it pants, and if you leave it, it ˹still˺ pants. This is the example of the people who deny Our signs. So narrate ˹to them˺ stories ˹of the past˺, so perhaps they will reflect.

— Surah al-A'raf 7:175–176

The Muslim commentators explain that Bal'am bin Ba'ura (Arabic: بلعام بن باعوراء) was a Canaanite who had been given knowledge of some of the books of God. His people asked him to curse Moses (Musa) and those who were with him, but he said, "How can I curse one who has angels with him?" They continued to press him, however, until he cursed the Israelites, and, as a consequence, they remained 40 years in the Wilderness of the Wanderings. Then, when he had cursed Moses, his tongue came out and fell upon his breast, and he began to pant like a dog.

The story as told by al-Tabari is somewhat more Biblical. Balaam had the knowledge of the Most Sacred Name of God, and whatever he asked of God was granted to him. The story of Balaam and the ass then follows at length. When it came to the actual cursing, God "turned his tongue" so that the cursing fell upon his own people and the blessing upon Israel. Then his tongue came out and hung down on his breast. Finally, he advised his people to adorn and beautify their women and to send them out to ensnare the Israelites. The story of the plague at Baal-peor and of Cozbi and Zimri follows.

According to another story which al-Tabari gives, Balaam was a renegade Israelite who knew the Most Sacred Name, and to gain the things of this world, went over to the Canaanites. Al-Tha'labi adds that Balaam was descended from Lot. He gives, too, the story of Balaam's dream, his being forbidden by God to curse Israel. Another version is that Balak, the king of Bal'a, compelled Balaam to use the Most Sacred Name against Israel. The curse fell automatically, and Moses, having learned whence it came, entreated God to take from Balaam his knowledge of the Name and his faith. This being done, they went out from him in the form of a white dove.

The Baghdadi historian al-Masudi said in his book The Meadows of Gold and Mines of Gems that Balaam ben Beor was in a village in the lands of Shem (Canaan), and he is the son of Baura(Beor) ben Sanur ben Waseem ben Moab ben Lot ben Haran, and his prayers were answered, so his people asked him to pray against Joshua ben Nun but he could not do it, so he advised some of the kings of the giants to show the pretty women and release them toward the camp of Joshua ben Nun, and so they did, and they (the Israelites) hurried up to the women and the plague spread among them and seventy thousand of them were dead.

== See also ==
- Balak (parsha)
- Beor (biblical figure)
- List of biblical figures identified in extra-biblical sources
- Peor
- Pethor
