= Kirjath-huzoth =

Moabite city

Kirjath-huzoth or Qiryath Chutsoth (Hebrew: קרית חצות, romanized: Qiryaṯ Ḥuṣōṯ), meaning city of streets or (in the Septuagint), city of villages, Numbers 22:39, was a Moabite city which some identify with Kirjathaim in eastern Jordan.

According to a story recorded in Numbers 22–24, Balak, King of Moab, received and entertained the soothsayer Balaam here, whom he had invited from Pethor, among the "mountains of the east," beyond the Euphrates, to lay a curse upon the Israelites, whose progress he had no hope otherwise of arresting. Balak offered a sacrifice of oxen and sheep there. It was probably from the summit of Attarus, the high place near the city, that the soothsayer first saw the encampments of Israel.
