= Michael Shepherd =

Michael or Mike Shepherd may refer to:

- Michael Shepherd (psychiatrist) (1923–1995), British psychiatrist
- Michael B. Shepherd (born 1977), American biblical scholar
- Michael Shepherd (voice actor), in The Little Prince (2010 TV series)
- Michael Shepherd, pseudonym of the author Robert Ludlum (1927–2001)
- Mike Shepherd (author) (born 1947), American science fiction writer
- Det. Senior Sergeant Mike Shepherd, the central protagonist in The Brokenwood Mysteries.
