= Peor =

Topics referred to by the same term

Peor (Hebrew: פְּעוֹר, Modern: Peʿōr, Tiberian: Pŏʿōr, Biblical: Paġor) meaning "opening", may refer to:

- The name of a mountain peak, mentioned in Numbers 23:28, to which Balak, king of Moab, led Balaam in his fourth and final attempt to induce Balaam to pronounce a curse upon the Israelites as they were passing through Balak's Land to the Promised Land. The tribes of Israel were described as being visible from the peak, but Balaam refused to curse them, and continued to offer blessings (Numbers 24:1–9).
- A reference to a deity who was worshipped at that mountain peak (Belphegor) and, biblically, was the subject of the heresy of Peor. The deity, worshipped by the Moabites, is biblically referred to as Baal-peor (Num. 25:3,5, 18) and as the "house of peor" (בית פעור) (Deuteronomy 3:29), generally meaning the Baal of Peor.
- An alternative translation of Phagor, a city of Judah mentioned in the Greek (Septuagint) version of the Book of Joshua (Joshua 15:59).
- In John Milton's "Paradise Lost", Peor is said to be the other name of the fallen angel Chemos, who "entic'd/Israel in Sittim on their march from Nile/To do him wanton rites, which cost them woe" (Paradise Lost, I.412-14). His deeds are described in the first book of the epic, as Milton describes Satan's followers who were banished from Heaven, and have pledged themselves as followers of the underworld.
