= Tzur =

Tzur is a Hebrew given name and surname literally meaning "rock". Notable people with the surname include:

== Given name ==
- Tzur Shezaf, Israeli author

== Surname ==
- Assaf Tzur, Israeli footballer
- David Tzur (born 1959), Israeli politician and former policeman
- Dov Tzur (born 1956), Israeli politician and mayor of Rishon LeZion
- Keren Tzur (born 1974), Israeli actress
- Ronen Tzur (born 1969), former Member of Knesset
- Tzvi Tzur (1923 – 2004), Israeli officer
- Ya'akov Tzur (born 1937), former Israeli politician
- Ze'ev Tzur (1911 – 1994), Israeli politician

== See also ==
- Ben-Tzur
- Zur
- Jacob Tsur
