= Pitru =

Coordinates: 36°39′16.62″N 38°4′7.96″E

Pitru was an ancient town off the Sajur (a.k.a. Sagura and Sagurru) (+36° 39' 16.62", +38° 4' 7.96"), a western tributary of the Euphrates, approximately 12.5 miles south of ancient Carchemish. It is thought to be the Pethor mentioned in Numbers 22 as the home of Balaam, the non-Israelite prophet called upon by Balak to curse the Israelites of the Exodus (circa 1406 BCE, perhaps).

Pitru was established by Assyrian ruler Tiglath-Pileser I in c. 1100 BCE, but it was later seized by the Arameans. It is later mentioned as one of the Hatti cities or villages conquered by either Ashurnasirpal II (reigned 883 – 859 BCE) or his son Shalmaneser III, Assyrian rulers. It was later given an Assyrian name in Shalmaneser's sixth year, becoming a base of operations for further military campaigns.

== Sources ==
- Bryce, Trevor., The Routledge Handbook of The People and Places of Ancient Western Asia: The Near East from the Early Bronze Age to the fall of the Persians Empire
- Hogarth, D. G. (David George), 1862-1927, The Ancient East
- Luckenbill, Daniel D., Ancient Records of Assyria and Babylonia, Vol. 1: Historical Records of Assyria, from the earliest times to Sargon, (Chicago: University of Chicago Press) 1926.
