= Deir Alla inscription =

Ancient inscription containing name known from Hebrew Bible

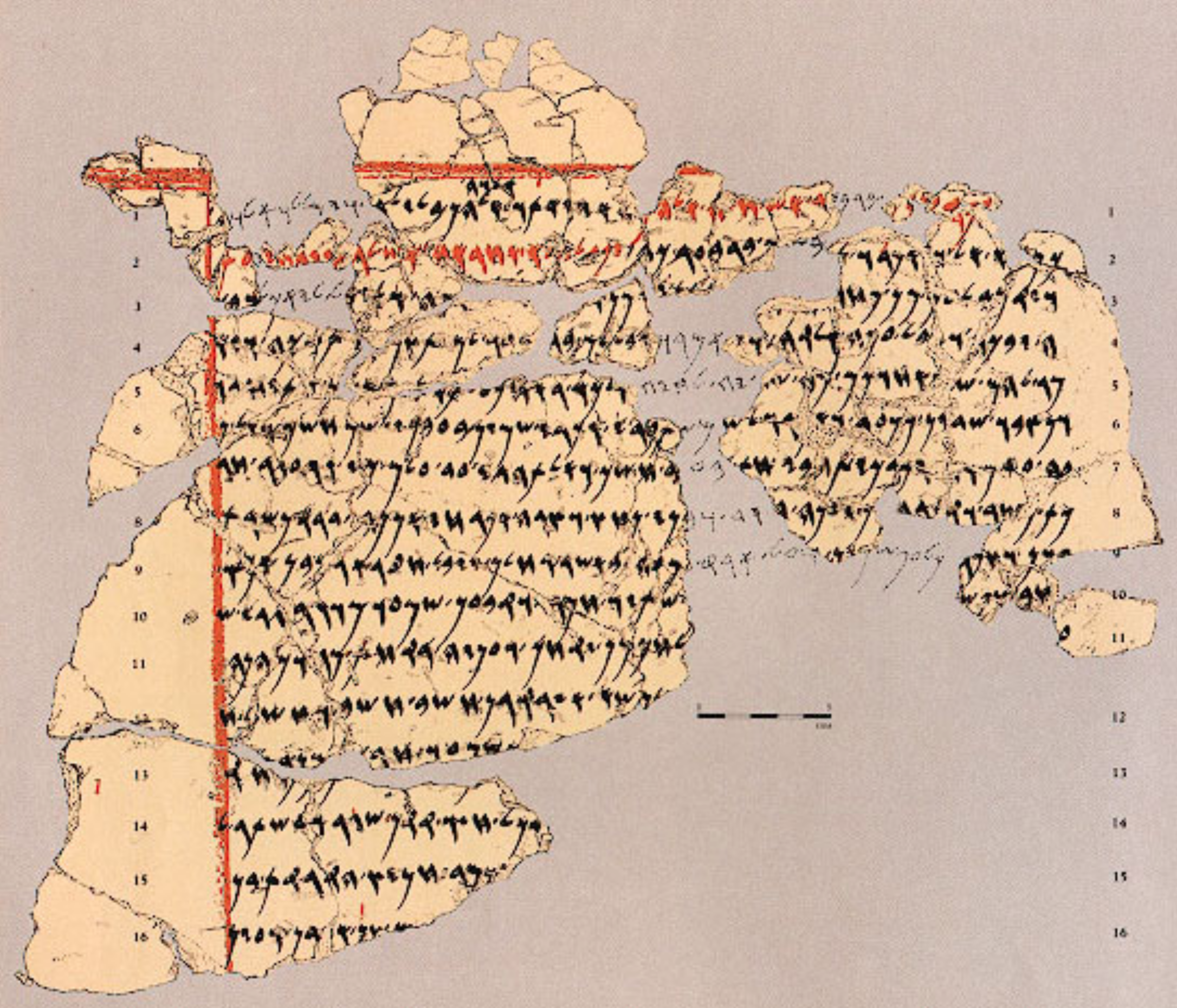
- Drawing of the Deir 'Alla inscription
- Created: c. 825 BC
- Discovered: 1967; Jordan Valley, Balqa, Jordan
- Present location: Amman, Amman Governorate, Jordan

The Deir 'Alla inscription or Balaam inscription, listed as KAI 312, was discovered during a 1967 excavation in Deir 'Alla, Jordan. It is currently held at the Jordan Archaeological Museum in Amman. It is written in a peculiar Northwest Semitic dialect, has provoked much debate among scholars and has had a strong impact on the study of Canaanite and Aramaic inscriptions.

== Context, content, significance ==
The excavation revealed a multiple-chamber structure that was destroyed by an earthquake during the Persian period. The multi-room complex probably had a cultic purpose. The inscription was written on the wall of one of the rooms and contains a story relating visions of Bal'am, son of Be'or, a "seer of the gods" (bl m br b r š ḥzh lhn), the same name - Balaam, son of Be'or - as in Numbers 22–24 and in other passages of the Hebrew Bible. The Deir Alla inscription's depiction of Bala'am differs from that in the Book of Numbers. Bal'am's god is associated with the goddess Šagar-we-Ishtar. Deities with such names, "Šagar-and-Ishtar" (or Aštar) certainly are known to history, but quite separately. The enigmatic narrative also foregrounds the Shaddayin (שדין) gods who establish a council. It also features the word Elohin, taken to mean "gods" in the plural rather than the Hebrew deity.

The inscriptions were on ink on plastered wall; black and red inks were used as in the plaster inscriptions at Kuntillet Ajrud. Red emphasized certain parts of the text. The inscriptions were written with a broad nibbed pen with ink, an extremely early example. The Oxford Handbook of Biblical Studies describes it as "the oldest example of a book in a West Semitic language written with an alphabet, and the oldest piece of Aramaic literature."

== Reconstruction and translation ==
When the text was found, it was broken into fragments. The fragments are poorly preserved, and only a part of the text has been found. In all, 119 pieces of ink-inscribed plaster were recovered. The wall, near the summit of the tell, was felled by a tremor.

Scholars have succeeded in arranging many of the fragments into two large 'combinations'. At least to some extent, they had use of information about which fragments were found close together or wide apart on the ground. Still, uncombined fragments remain. For the reading of damaged or missing parts of the text, they sometimes had to guess; however, where the same group of words seems to appear in several places, but with different parts damaged in different occurrences, they could reasonably reconstruct a combined text.

The first complete translation and reconstruction of the inscription was published in 1981. Today, the text in modern Hebrew letters is available online. The text is difficult to read and to interpret. Here is one reconstruction and translation of the first combination:

1. [This is] the book of [Ba]laam, [son of Beo]r, a seer of the gods. To him came the gods at night. [And they spoke to] him
2. according to the utterance of El, and they spoke to [Bala]am, son of Beor, thus: [ ... ]
3. And Balaam arose in the morning, [ ... ] And he was not [able to eat. And he fast]ed while he was weep-
4. ing greviously. And his people came to him, and the[y said] to Balaam, son of Beor: "Why do you fast? [And w]hy do you weep?" And he sa-
5. id to them: "Sit down! I will show you what the Shadd[ayin are ...ing] Now come, see what the Elohin are about to do! The Elo[h]in gathered,
6. while the Shaddayin met in assembly, and said to Sha[mash]: "Thou mayest break the bolts of heaven, in thy clouds let there be gloominess, and no bril-
7. liance, darkness(?) and not thy radiance(?) thou mayest cause terror [by] the gloomy [cl]ouds– but do not be angry forever! For the swift is re-
8. proaching the eagle, and the vultures' brood the ostrich. The st[ork is ...ing] the [young of the] hawk, and the owl the chicks of the heron. The swallow is ...ing the
9. dove, and the sparrow the [ ... ] And [ ... ] staff. Where the stick would lead sheep, hares are eating
10. [the g]rass. [ ... ] The [ ... ] are drinking wine. The hyenas are listening to instruction. The young of the [ ... ]
11. while [the ... ] is laughing at wise men. And the poor woman is preparing an ointment of myrrh. And the priestess
12. [ ... ] And...
13. ...while the deaf are hearing from afar.
14. ...And all are beholding the oppression (exercised) by Shagar-and-Ishtar.
15. ...the leopard. The piglet is driving out the (you-
16. [ng] of the...) [ ... ] ...destruction and ruins.

A more recent and complete English translation can also be found online.

The second combination: (Note: In large measure following Dewrell 2017.)

1. [ ... ]
2. [ ... ]
3. [ ... ]
4. [ ... ] El satisfies himself with lovemaking. (Note: The idiom rwy ddn, Heb rawah dodim: 'to satisfy oneself with lovemaking'. After Levine.)
5. [ ... ] Why is the tot (Note: nqr: 'sprout, scion'; see Isaiah 11:1: "… a shoot from the stump of Jesse". However, Levine says nqr means 'corpse'; it could be both or wordplay.) in the tophet (Note: Following Hackett: mdr, 'firepit'.) with the foliage? (Note: Or something wet.)
6. So that El will be satisfied. He will make to the house of eternity. (Note: Ambiguity follows original.)
7. a house which no travelers enter, nor does a bridegroom, [a house ... ]
8. as wormrot (Note: 'Wormrot' is Levine's word based on Isaiah 14:11: tahteyka yussa' rimmah 'wormrot is to be set as your bed'.) from a grassy grave. From the reckless affairs of man, and from the lustful desires [ ... ]
9. Your sacrifices make poor haruspecy. [ ... ]
10. [From] the bed, (or you will) cover him with one garment. Look, if you mistreat (lit. hate) him he will falter [ ... ]
11. punishment, [and wormrot] under your head, you shall lie on your eternal bed. To pass away to [ ... ]
12. [ ... ] all [ ... ] in their heart! The corpse moans in his heart! (Note: Or, 'the child sighs to itself'.) He moans [ ... ]
13. daughter. There, sacrifices shall be held Bal[ ... ] There is no compassion when death seizes an infant! And an infant [ ... ]
14. An infant [ ... ] there [ ... ] shall endure, he sighs to his heart as he approaches [Sheol ... ]
15. To the edge of She[ol ... ] and the shadow of the hedge [ ... ] The quest of a king becomes his "moth", (Note: The citation mark as given by Levine. The phrase is šʔlt. mlk. ssh – ssh (for which Levine tentatively tries "moth") could also mean 'horse'. The common word mlk can mean 'king' or 'sacrifice'. If ʔlt is the root, it could have many possible meanings.) and the q[ue]st of [ ... ]
16. [ ... ] and [ ... ] seers. Your quest has become dis[tant] from you! Why [ ... ]
17. To know how to deliver an oracle to his people, you have been condemned for what you have said, and banned from pronouncing words of execration.
18. [ ... ]
19. [ ... ]
20. [ ... ]
21. [ ... ]

== Language ==
South Gileadite
- Deir 'Alla, Deer ˤAlla
- Native to: Jordan
- Region: Deir Alla
- Era: 880–770 BC
- Language family: Afro-Asiatic: West Semitic; Central Semitic; Northwest Semitic; (unclassified); South Gileadite

Language codes
- ISO 639-3: None (mis)
- Linguist List: xdr
- Glottolog: None

Though containing some features of Aramaic, such as the word bar "(son of [Beor])" rather than the Canaanite ben, the Deir Alla inscription also has many elements of Canaanite languages, leading some to believe it was written in a dialect of Canaanite rather than an early form of Aramaic. The inscription has been dated to 880–770 BC.

Klaus Beyer calls the language South Gileadite.

Holger Gzella reckons the mixture of Canaanite vocabulary and narration with a primarily Aramaic grammatical core reflect a translation of a Canaanite story into a literary Aramaic text. The Semitic Etymological Dictionary categorizes the Deir Alla language as simply "dialect of the inscription from Deir Alla."

== Tablets with unknown script and hemp cloth ==
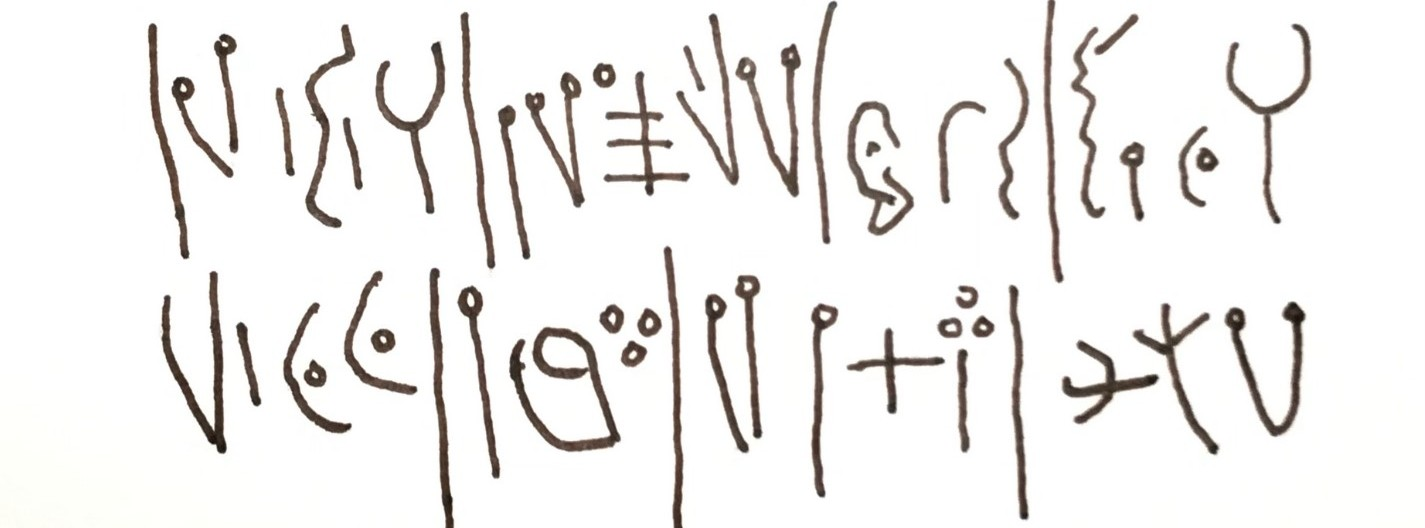
The dig's conclusion was delayed by the surprise discovery of this and other tablets in unknown script.

In the 1960s, in addition to hundreds of vessels like bowls and jars, seven clay tablets were found with an unknown script. As of 2021, they had not yet been fully deciphered, nor has their clay been tested to see if it's local to Deir Alla.

The only discovery of hemp cloth in an archaeological context in the Iron Age Levant is a piece of very fine hemp textile found on a loom in a room adjacent to the one containing the inscription. The entire complex probably had a cultic purpose, the unique and exquisite textile thought to have been woven for the goddess Shagar, who is mentioned in the inscription. The complex most likely dates to the 2nd half of the 9th century BCE, being destroyed by an earthquake around 800 BCE. It may be noted that the hemp product cannabis has been found at an Iron Age cultic site further southwest, Tel Arad in the Negev, as residue of burned incense in a temple - also a surprising discovery.

== See also ==
- Balaam, biblical figure
- Beor (biblical figure)
- El Shaddai, one name of the God of Israel
- KNMY inscription from Carthage; mentions child sacrifice
- Pethor, home town of Bala'am in the Bible
- Samalian language, Semitic language
- Sukkot (place), identified by some with Deir Alla

== Bibliography ==
- Dewrell, Heath D. (2017). Child Sacrifice in Ancient Israel. Winona Lake, Indiana: Eisenbrauns. ISBN 978-1-57506-494-9.
- Caquot, A., and A. Lemaire (1977). "Les textes araméens de Deir 'Alla". Syria.
- Dijkstra, Meindert, "Is Balaam Also Among the Prophets?" Journal of Biblical Literature 114/1 (1995), 43–64.
- Hackett, Jo Ann, The Balaam Text from Deir 'Alla, HSM 31 (Chico, CA: Scholars, 1984).
- Hoftijzer, J. and G. van der Kooij, G., Aramaic Texts from Deir ‘Alla (Leiden: Brill, 1976).
- Hoftijzer, J. and G. van der Kooij, G., ed., The Balaam Text from Deir 'Alla Re-evaluated: Proceedings of the International Symposium Held at Leiden, 21–24 August 1989, (Leiden: Brill, 1991).
- Puech, E. "L'inscription sur pl tre de Tell Deir Alla," in Biblical Archaeology Today: Proceedings of the International Congress on Biblical Archaeology Jerusalem, April 1984, ed. by J. Amitai (Jerusalem: IES, 1985), 354–65.
- Weippert, Manfred, "The Balaam Text from Deir 'Alla and the Study of the Old Testament," pp. 151–84 in The Balaam Text from Deir 'Alla Re-evaluated: Proceedings of the International Symposium Held at Leiden, 21–24 August 1989, (Leiden: Brill, 1991).
- McCarter Jr., P. Kyle, "The Balaam Texts from Deir 'Alla: The First Combination", Bulletin of the Schools of Oriental Research 239 (1980): 49–60
- Naveh, J. "The Date of the Deir 'Alla Inscription in Aramaic Script", Israel Exploration Journal 17 (1967): 236–38.
