= Beor (biblical figure) =

Biblical figure

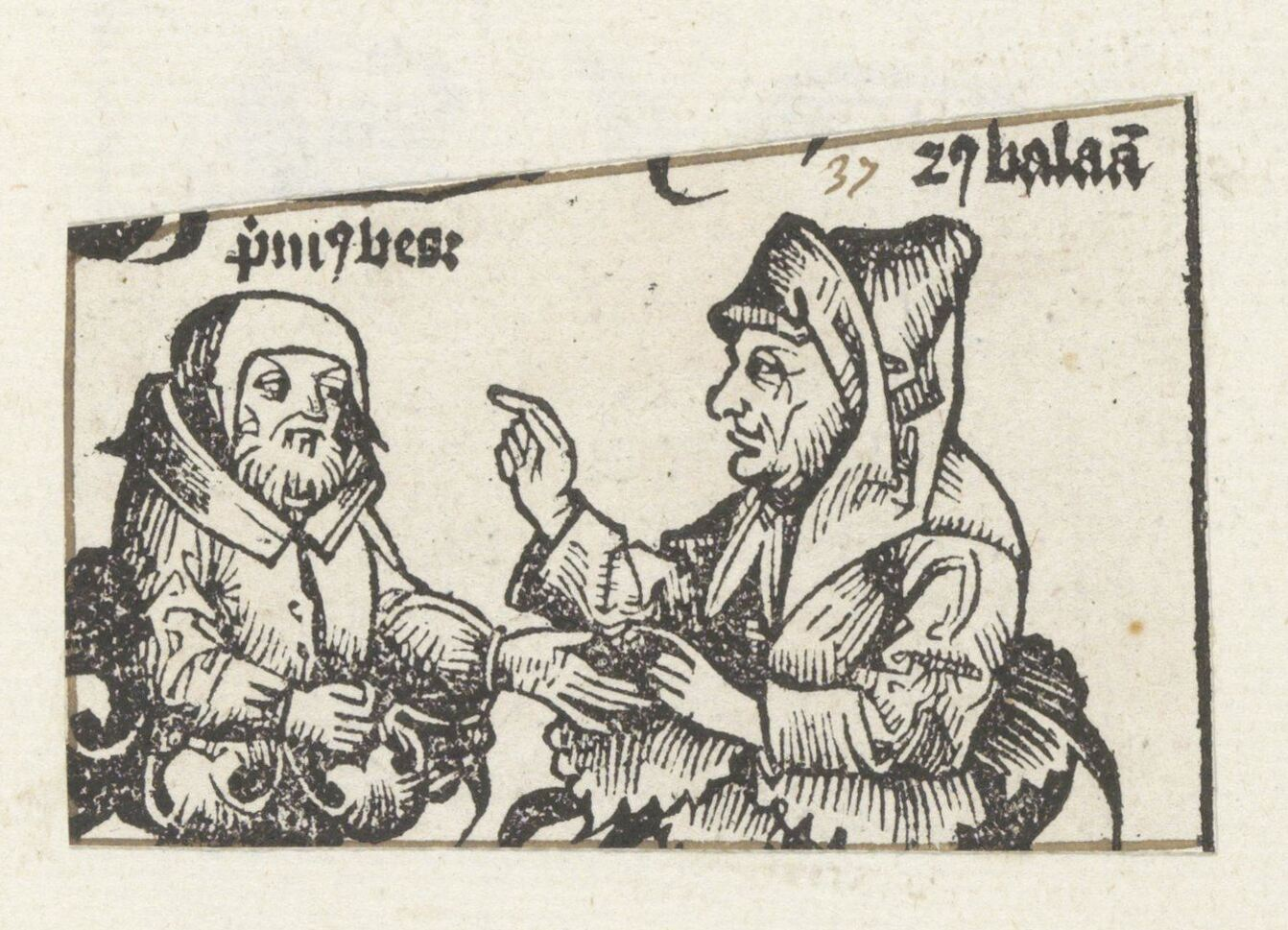
Beor and Balaam in the Nuremberg Chronicle

Beor (Hebrew: בְּעוֹר Bə‘ōr, "a burning"; Old Aramaic: 𐤁𐤏𐤓, romanized: Bᵊʿôr) is a name which appears in relation to a king ("Bela son of Beor") and a diviner ("Balaam son of Beor"). Because the two names vary only by a single letter (ם, -m, often added to the ends of names), scholars have hypothesized that the two refer to the same person.

== In the Bible ==
In a list of kings of Edom, Genesis records that a "Bela (בלע) son of Beor" was one of the kings of Edom who reigned "before there reigned any king over the children of Israel." Bela son of Beor is listed as the first of eight kings. The same information in Genesis is repeated in Chronicles.

"Balaam (בלעם) son of Beor" appears in a well-known story in Numbers, where he is asked to curse the Israelites but repeatedly blesses them instead. Later, he is mentioned as the instigator of tempting the Israelites into sin at Mount Peor, for which he is eventually killed. He is mentioned in passing in Deuteronomy, in a passage which repeats a synopsis of earlier biblical stories.

Beor is also mentioned in Micah 6:5.

== Jewish tradition ==
Beor the father of Balaam is considered a prophet by Judaism. The Talmud says in Baba Bathra 15b, "Seven prophets prophesied to the heathen, namely, Balaam and his father, Job, Eliphaz the Temanite, Bildad the Shuhite, Zophar the Naamathite, and Elihu, the son of Barachel the Buzite." In the King James translation of 2 Peter 2:15, Beor is called Bosor (from the Greek Βεὼρ). Beor's father was Laban the Aramean and Beor's son was Balaam

== Islamic tradition ==
The Baghdadi historian Al-Masudi said in his book Meadows of Gold and Mines of Gems that Balaam ben Beor was in a village in the lands of Shem (Canaan), and he is the son of Baura (Beor) ben Sanur ben Waseem ben Moab ben Lot ben Haran (PUT), and his prayers were answered. So his people asked him to pray against Joshua ben Nun but he could not do it. So he advised some of the kings of the giants to show the pretty women and release them toward the camp of Joshua ben Nun, and this they did. The Israelites hurried to the women and a plague spread among them, resulting in the deaths of seventy thousand people.

== Archaeology ==
A c. late 9th century BCE inscription on wall plaster discovered at the archaeological site of Deir Alla in Balqa Governorate, Jordan, records a prophecy of Balaam, who is named as son of Beor.
