= Bamoth-Baal =

Bamoth-Baal was an elevated point in the land of Moab mentioned in the Hebrew Bible as the first of three places where the prophet Balaam delivered an oracle (Numbers 22:41). It was allotted to the Tribe of Reuben, and included with a list of towns near Heshbon (Joshua 13:17). It is probably identical with the Bamoth between Nahaliel and the "valley that is in the country of Moab, to the top of Pisgah", mentioned in the list of stopping-places in Numbers 21:19-20. Bethbamot in the Moabite Stone, line 27 (perhaps this is also the reading of Isaiah 16:2), may also be considered as connected with it.

According to the allotments in Joshua 13:17, some take the place to be on Mount 'Aṭṭârûs. G.A. Smith ("Historical Geography of Palestine," p. 562) is inclined to the opinion of Conder ("Heth and Moab," pp. 189 et seq.) that it is located at one of the many cromlechs above the Wadi Dchîded, northeast of the Dead Sea. The statement of Eusebius, which places it on the Arnon, is likely inaccurate.

== See also ==
- High place: bamot or bamoth is the plural of the Hebrew word במה, meaning "high place".
