= Ben-Tzur =

Ben-Tzur a Hebrew surname literally meaning son of Tzur. Notable people with the surname include:

- Shmaryahu Ben-Tzur, Israeli politician
- Shye Ben Tzur, Israeli musician
- Yoav Ben-Tzur, Israeli politician and rabbi
