= Cozbi =

Biblical character

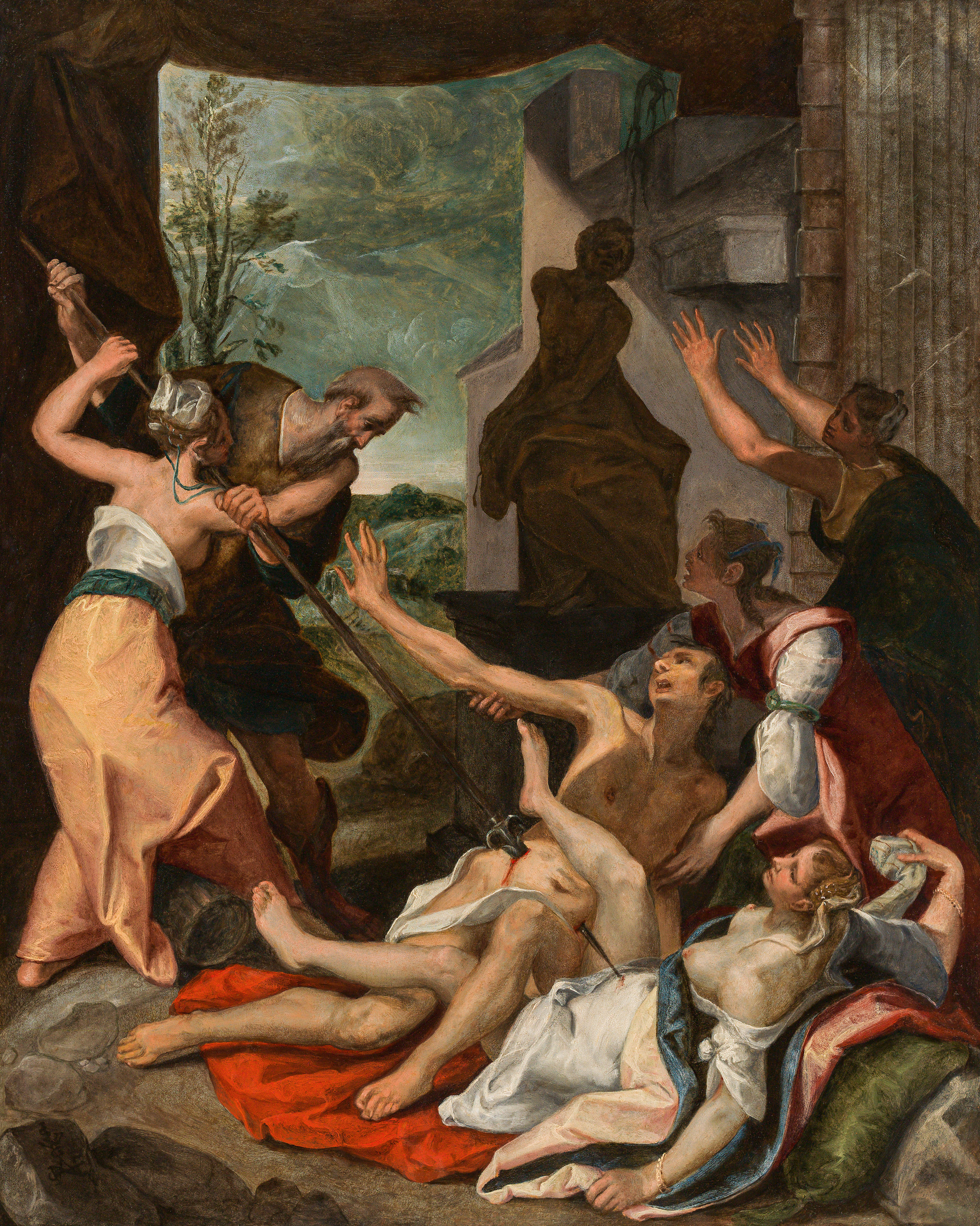
Phinehas slaying Zimri and Cozbi, by Joos van Winghe

Cozbi or Kozbi (Biblical Hebrew: כָּזְבִּי, tr. Kozbī) is mentioned in Numbers 25 in the Hebrew Bible as "[the] daughter of Zur", a prominent Midianite, and a wife or concubine of the Israelite Zimri, son of Salu. The Lord objected to the mixing of the Israelite people with the local Midianites, and the resultant worshiping of Baal, and instructed Moses to slay all the Israelites who had worshiped Baal.

"And behold, one of the people of Israel came and brought a Mid'ianite woman to his family, in the sight of Moses and in the sight of the whole congregation of the people of Israel, while they were weeping at the door of the tent of meeting. When Phin'ehas the son of Elea'zar, son of Aaron the priest, saw it, he rose and left the congregation, and took a spear in his hand and went after the man of Israel into the inner room, and pierced both of them, the man of Israel and the woman, through her body. Thus the plague was stayed from the people of Israel. Nevertheless those that died by the plague were twenty-four thousand." Numbers 25:6–9 (Revised Standard Version)

Phinehas son of Eleazar (son of Aaron) picked up a spear and killed Zimri and Cozbi with one thrust. According to rabbinic tradition, Zimri and Cozbi fornicated in 424 acts of coitus at that juncture before Phinehas killed them. The meaning of that precise number of coituses and whether it is meant to be taken literally has been debated by scholars. The incident was then taken as a pretext for the War against the Midianites in Numbers 31.

== Popular culture ==
- A Robert Burns song, I Murder Hate, alludes to Cozbi in its final line.

== See also ==
- Heresy of Peor
- Zimri (prince)
