= Deir Alla =

Deir Alla مدينة دير علا
- City
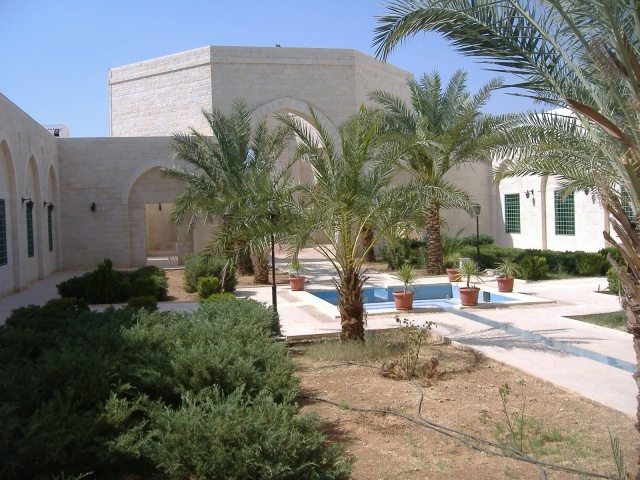
- Mosque of Abu Ubaidah Amer ibn al-Jarrah in Deir Alla

- Flag Seal

- Location in Jordan
- Coordinates: 32°11′20″N 35°36′11″E
- Palestine grid: 208/178
- Country: Jordan
- Province: Balqa Governorate
- Municipality established: 1967

Government
  - Mayor: Khalifa Solomen Diyat
- Elevation: −1,030 ft (−314 m)

Population (2015)
  - City: 7,321
  - Metro: 73,477
- Time zone: UTC+2 (GMT)
  - Summer (DST): +3
- Area code: +(962)5
- Website: http://deirallacity.gov.jo/

Deir Alla (Arabic: دير علا) is the site of an ancient Near Eastern town in Balqa Governorate, Jordan. The Deir Alla Inscription, datable to c. 840–760 BCE, was found here.

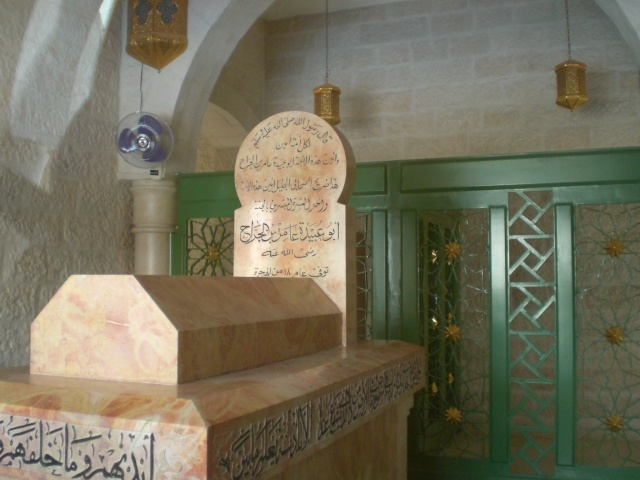
Tomb of the Muslim commander Abu Ubaidah ibn al-Jarrah

On 20 August 2010, it recorded a temperature of 51.1 °C (124.0 °F), the new official highest temperature in the history of Jordan.

== Identification ==
Deir Alla has been suggested to be the biblical Sukkot in Transjordan. Some believe it to be the biblical Pethor. It was also suggested by an early traveler to the site, Selah Merrill, who found parallels with names in the Hebrew Bible.

Deir Alla is identified with the Byzantine period town of Tar'elah or Dar'elah, which the Jerusalem Talmud identifies with biblical Sukkot.

== Archaeology ==
The tell is 50 by 200 meters (160 by 660 ft) and rises to 27 meters (89 ft) above the plain. A series of Dutch excavations sponsored by the Netherlands Organisation for the Advancement of Pure Research began in 1960, under the auspices of the department of theology, University of Leiden. These excavations continued for five seasons until 1967. The excavation made its most dramatic discovery in 1967, an ink wall inscription relating a hitherto-unknown prophecy of Balaam, who thereby becomes the first Old Testament prophet to be identified in an inscription. After a long interruption, work resumed in 1976, initially under Franken, for several seasons. After another long break, occasional seasons were conducted beginning in 1994 until 2008.

At the end of the 1964 campaign, 11 clay tablets, 3 inscribed in a West Semitic Early Canaanite script, 7 bearing only dots, and one uninscribed, were discovered. The tablets were found in the destruction layer of storerooms dated by a cartouche of Queen Twosret of Egypt to around 1200 BCE. Earlier objects were also found there so the tablets may well predate the destruction. In the later excavations several more clay tablets were found, for a total of 15.

=== The Balaam inscription ===
The 1967 excavation revealed a many-chambered structure that had also been destroyed by earthquake, during the Persian period at the site. On a wall was written a story relating visions of the seer of the gods "Balʿam son of Beʿor" (Balaam son of Beor), who may be the same Balʿam son of Beʿor mentioned in Numbers 22–24 and in other passages of the Bible. The Deir Alla Balaam is associated with "a god bearing the name Shgr, 'Shadday' gods and goddesses, and with the goddess Ashtar."

It reflects the oldest example of story from a biblical book (Numbers) written in a West Semitic alphabetic script, and is considered the oldest piece of West Semitic literature transmitted in a still debated Semitic language. The Deir Alla Inscription is datable to c. 840–760 BCE; it was written in red and black inks on a plastered wall; 119 pieces of inked plaster were recovered. The wall, near the summit of the tell, was felled by yet another tremor.

== History ==
=== Late Bronze Age ===
The town was a sanctuary and metal-working centre, ringed by smelting furnaces built against the exterior of the city walls, whose successive rebuildings, dated by ceramics from the Late Bronze Age, sixteenth century BCE, to the fifth century BCE, accumulated as a tell based on a low natural hill. The hopeful identification of the site as the biblical Sukkot is not confirmed by any inscription at the site.

Deir Alla was the first Bronze Age city excavated in Jordan. The initial expectations were of establishing a relative chronology of Levantine pottery in the transition between the Bronze Age to the Iron Age, established through meticulous stratigraphy. It was intended to span a gap between established chronologies at Jericho and Samaria.

The oldest sanctuary at Deir Alla dates to the Late Bronze Age; it was peacefully rebuilt at intervals, the floor being raised as the tell accumulated height, and the squared altar stone renewed, each new one placed atop the previous one.

During the 19th Dynasty of Egypt, the final sanctuary was obliterated in a fierce fire; the blackened remains of an Egyptian jar bearing the cartouche of Queen Twosret gives a terminus post quem of c. 1200 BCE, a date consonant with other twelfth-century urban destruction in the Ancient Near East.

=== Iron Age ===
Unlike some other destroyed sites, Deir Alla's habitation continued after the disaster, without a break, into the Iron Age; the discontinuity was a cultural one, with highly developed pottery of a separate ceramic tradition post-dating the destruction.

=== Ayyubid/Mamluk era ===
A sugar mill, dating from the Ayyubid/Mamluk era, was in use in the village until 1967.

=== Ottoman era ===
In 1596, during the Ottoman Empire, Deir Alla was noted in the census as being located in the nahiya of Gawr in the liwa of Ajloun. It had a population of 46 Muslim households and 4 Muslim bachelors. They paid a taxes on various agricultural products, including wheat, barley, sesame, cotton, goats and beehives, in addition to occasional revenues, water buffalos and a water mill; a total of 10,500 akçe.

=== Modern era ===
The Jordanian census of 1961 reported 1,190 inhabitants in Deir Alla.

== Tourist attractions ==
As well as being the site of the Deir Alla Inscription, Deir Alla is also the site of Battle of Fahl between the Muslim Caliphate and the Byzantine Empire. There are several tombs of Sahabah (followers of Muhammad) in Deir Alla:

- Abu Ubaidah ibn al-Jarrah
- Dhiraar bin Al-Azwar
- Sharhabeel ibn Hasana

== See also ==
- Kuntillet Ajrud
- Cities of the ancient Near East

== Bibliography ==
- Government of Jordan, Department of Statistics (1964). First Census of Population and Housing. Volume I: Final Tables; General Characteristics of the Population (PDF).
- Hütteroth, W.-D.; Abdulfattah, K. (1977). Historical Geography of Palestine, Transjordan and Southern Syria in the Late 16th Century. Erlanger Geographische Arbeiten, Sonderband 5. Erlangen, Germany: Vorstand der Fränkischen Geographischen Gesellschaft. ISBN 3-920405-41-2.
- Pringle, D. (1997). Secular buildings in the Crusader Kingdom of Jerusalem: an archaeological Gazetter. Cambridge University Press. ISBN 0521-46010-7.
- Een Verhalla voor het Oprapen. Opgravingen de Deir Alla in de Jordaanvallei, Leiden: Rijksmuseum van Oudheden, 1989. ISBN 90-71201-09-0
