= Zur =

Zur may refer to:

== People ==
- Bella Zur (born 1952), Israeli former Paralympic athlete and politician
- Dov Zur (born 1955), Israeli politician, former mayor of Rishon LeZion
- Giorgio Zur (1930–2019), German Roman Catholic archbishop and Vatican diplomat
- Inon Zur (born 1965), American music composer
- Jacob ibn Zur (1673–1753), Moroccan poet, scholar and rabbi
- Krisztina Fazekas Zur (born 1980), Hungarian sprint canoer
- Monika Żur (born 1993), Polish racing cyclist
- Noam Zur (born 1981), Israeli orchestra conductor
- Rami Zur (born 1977), American retired sprint canoer, husband of Krisztina Zur

== Places ==
- Zhur (Serbian: Žur), a village in Kosovo
- Żur, Kociewie, Poland, a village

== Other uses ==
- żur, the Polish version of sour cereal soup
- Zinc uptake regulator, also referred to as Zur
- Zur, an element in some aristocratic German surnames - see von

== See also ==
- Tzur, a common alternative transliterations of the Hebrew-language surname צוּר
- Zürs, a winter sports resort in the Alps
