= Pethor =

Home of the prophet Balaam

Pethor or Petor (פְּתוֹר) in the Hebrew Bible is the home of the prophet Balaam. In the Book of Numbers, Pethor is described as being located "by the river of the land of the children of his people". The Bible usually uses the name "the River" to the Euphrates; the rest of the description is somewhat vague and perhaps corrupted. In Deuteronomy, Balaam is from "Pethor of Aram-Naharaim" in Upper Mesopotamia. It is widely accepted that Pethor is the town Pitru, which is mentioned in ancient Assyrian records.

The Hebrew root of the name Pethor is פתר PTR, which corresponds to the Aramaic root פשר PŠR. Both roots refer, as verbs and nouns, to dream interpretation. This raises the possibility that Pethor is not the name of a town but rather a description of Balaam's occupation. Indeed, the Peshitta translates into Aramaic פְּתוֹרָה "to Pethor" in Numbers as פְּשׁוֹרָא, which means "the interpreter". The Vulgata translates "Pethor" by "ariolum", which means a fortuneteller. The Targum Neofiti translates "Pethor" as פתורה חלמיי "dream interpreter." In Deuteronomy, Balaam is "from Pethor, Aram-Naharain." The Vulgata and the Septuaginta omit "Pethor," and the Neofiti translates it, like in Numbers, "dream interpreter."

The Deir Alla inscription, dated to 880–770 BCE, describes a vision of "Bal'am son of Be'or," which seems to be the same figure described in the Bible. However, there is no mention of the town he lives in. In addition to the inscription, tablets dated to the Late Bronze were found in Deir Alla. The signs on these tablets are enigmatic and do not correspond to any known alphabet. W. Shea suggested reading these tablets with the root ptr. He concluded that Pethor is Deir Alla. However, more recent study of these tablets, by Gerrit van der Kooij and Michel de Vreeze suggested a completely different deciphering of the signs on the tablets, and in particular ptr is not found there.
