= Michael B. Shepherd =

American biblical scholar

Michael B. Shepherd (born January 1977) is an assistant professor of Biblical Studies at Cedarville University who specializes in Hebrew/Aramaic language and exegesis. Before joining Cedarville in 2015, Shepherd held the John and Allie Fogleman Assistant Professor of Old Testament and Hebrew at Louisiana College in Pineville, Louisiana, as well as professor of Old Testament and Hebrew at the Caskey School of Divinity.

== Education ==
Shepherd received a B.F.A. from New School University (2000) and a M.Div. (2004) and Ph.D. (2006) from Southeastern Baptist Theological Seminary.

== Works ==
=== Books ===
- The Verbal System of Biblical Aramaic: A Distributional Approach. New York: Peter Lang, 2008.
- Daniel in the Context of the Hebrew Bible. New York: Peter Lang, 2009.
- The Twelve Prophets in the New Testament. New York: Peter Lang, 2011.
- A Commentary on the Book of the Twelve: The Minor Prophets. Kregel Publications, 2018.
- A Commentary on Jeremiah. Kregel Publications, 2023.
- An Introduction to the Making and Meaning of the Bible. Eerdmans, 2024.

=== Articles ===
- “The New Exodus in the Composition of the Twelve.” In Text and Canon, ed. Paul J. Kissling and Robert L. Cole. Oregon: Pickwick, forthcoming.
- “The Compound Subject in Biblical Hebrew.” Hebrew Studies 52 (forthcoming 2011).
- “Targums.” In Dictionary of Jesus and the Gospels (Revised), ed. Joel B. Green. Downers Grove: InterVarsity, forthcoming.
- “Hebrew Acrostic Poems and their Vocabulary Stock.” Journal of Northwest Semitic Languages 36/2 (2010): 95–108.
- “Targums, the New Testament, and Biblical Theology of the Messiah.” Journal of the Evangelical Theological Society 51 (2008): 45–58.
- “Compositional Analysis of the Twelve.” Zeitschrift für die alttestamentliche Wissenschaft 120 (2008): 184–193.
- “The Distribution of Verbal Forms in Biblical Aramaic.” Journal of Semitic Studies 52 (2007): 225–42.
- “Daniel 7:13 and the New Testament Son of Man.” Westminster Theological Journal 68 (2006): 99–111.

=== Reviews ===
- Review of The Cultic Motif in the Book of Daniel, by Winfried Vogel. Catholic Biblical Quarterly (forthcoming).
- Review of Prophecy and Hermeneutics: Toward a New Introduction to the Prophets, by Christopher R. Seitz. Review of Biblical Literature (2008).
- Review of Fundamental Biblical Hebrew/Fundamental Biblical Aramaic, by Andrew H. Bartelt and Andrew Steinmann. Faith & Mission 22.1 (2005): 111–112.
