= Balak =

Biblical character

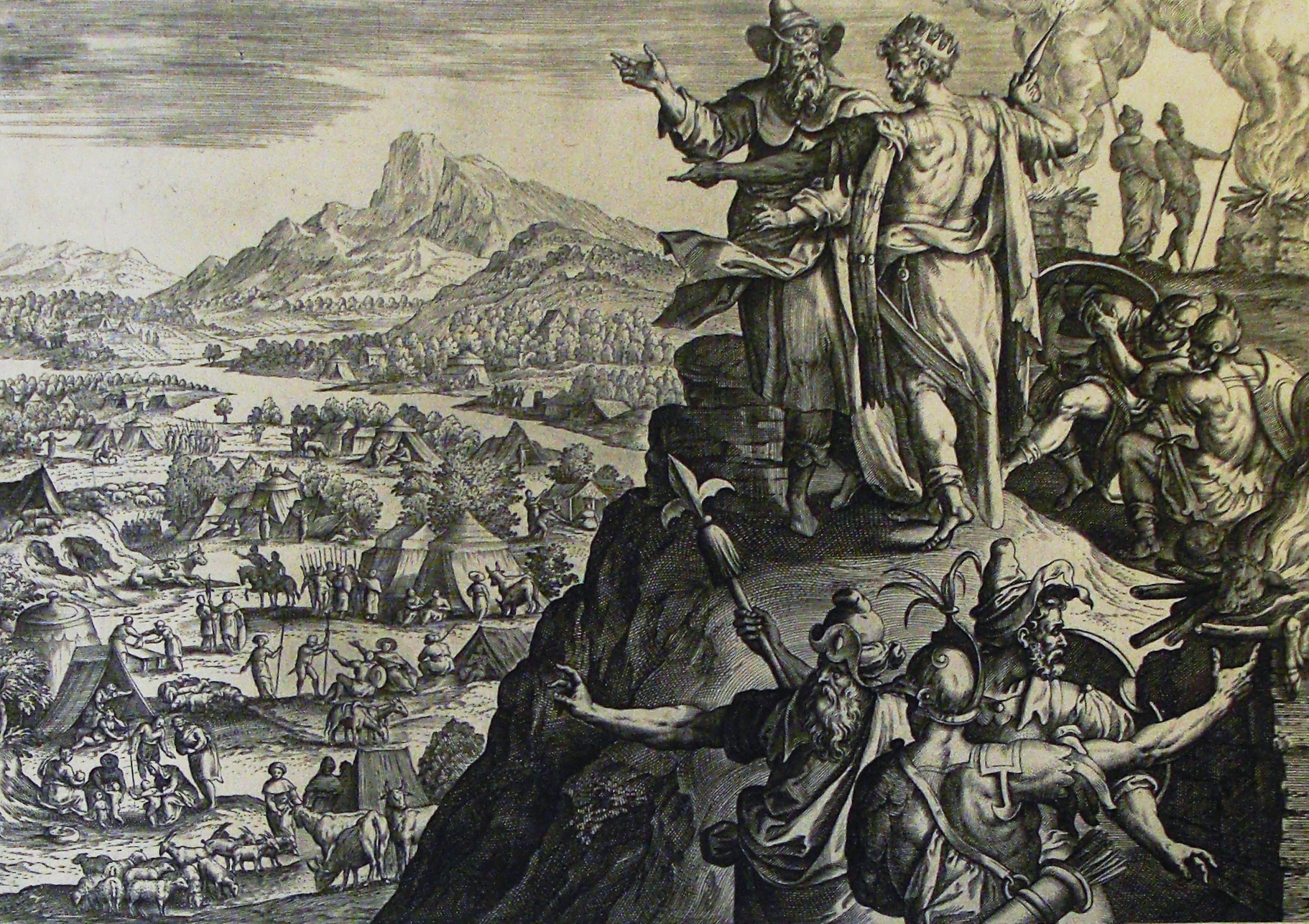
- Balak (wearing a crown) with Balaam

In-universe information
- Title: King of Moab
- Family: Zippor (father)
- Relatives: Eglon (grandson)
- Religion: Chemosh
- Nationality: Moab
- Birth place: Kingdom of Moab
- Death place: Kingdom of Moab

Balak (Hebrew: בָּלָק Bālāq) was a king of Moab described in the Book of Numbers in the Hebrew Bible, where his dealings with the prophet and Midianite sorcerer Balaam are recounted. Balak tried to engage Balaam for the purpose of cursing the migrating Israelites. The story of Balak is detailed in Numbers 22–24, Judges 11:25, and Micah 6:5. According to Numbers 22:2, and Joshua 24:9, Balak was the son of Zippor.

In the chapter of Numbers preceding the introduction of Balak, the Israelites, seeking the Promised Land following their Exodus from Egypt, had defeated the Canaanites at a place named Hormah, as well as the Amorites and the people of Bashan, and next approached Moab. The biblical narrative stresses the fears of the people of Moab, who were 'exceedingly afraid' and 'sick with dread' (NKJV) or 'terrified' (GNT). Their fears appear to relate to the size of the Israelite population and the consequent resource depletion which could be expected if they were permitted to occupy Moabite land.

Balak initially conferred with his Midianite allies in order to block Israelite settlement, before sending his elders (and Midianite elders) to seek Balaam's curse on them. Balak sent messengers to Balaam to ask him to come curse the Israelites for them. But, when Balaam consulted God, God told him he musn't go for the people of Israel are a blessed people. Balak again sent messengers more distinguished and more numerous this time with promises of even more gold and silver then before. God tells Balaam he can go but to only do as He commands. As Balaam sets out to Moab God is angry and sends an angel to block his way. On his journey to meet the princes of Moab, the angel of the Lord blocks Balaam's path three times causing his donkey to veer off the path. The angel was visible to the donkey but not to Balaam. Each time the donkey moved to avoid the angel with sword drawn Balaam would beat her. After the third time the Lord opened the mouth of the donkey to speak, asking, "why do you beat me?" Then God opened Balaam's eyes so that he could see the angel with his sword drawn standing before him. He tells the angel he will return home: "I have sinned, for I did not know that you stood against me on the road". The angel instructs Balaam to attend the meeting with the princes of Moab but to "say only what I tell you".

After his mission with Balaam to curse Israelites failed, Balak decided to ally with Midianites to gather their women in order to lead Israelites men astray in adultery.

According to the Pulpit Commentary, Balak seems to be mentioned by name on a papyrus in the British Museum; Gardiner and Caminos, however, transcribe and translate this name as Baꜥalry. In 2019, Israel Finkelstein, Nadav Na'aman and Thomas Römer proposed the common reading of "House of David" in the Mesha Stele is actually "Balak".

== The Zohar ==
The Zohar, the basic text of the Kabbalah, offers a special interpretation to the Balak being "The Son of Zippor". In Hebrew, "Zippor" (ציפור) means "bird". According to the Zohar, this was not the name of Balak's father but rather referred to a magical metal bird which Balak made use of. As the Zohar recounts, such a bird has a head made of gold, a mouth made of silver and wings made of copper mixed with silver, and its body is made of gold; once the bird is made, it should be put during the day in a window facing the Sun and during the night in a window facing the Moon, while burning incense in front of it for seven days and seven nights. Thereupon, the bird would start talking and foretelling of what is about to happen. Only the most skilled of wizards could construct such a bird. Balak, the greatest wizard of his age, managed it. The bird was always sitting on Balak's shoulder and whispering in his ear, and therefore he was nicknamed "Son of the Bird". The Zohar further recounts that the bird spoke true words of prophecy in Balak's ear and warned him not to set himself against the Sons of Israel, and also foretold of the harsh punishment in store for himself and for the Moabits. Nevertheless, Balak persisted in his wrong way and was punished exactly as the bird foretold.

== New Testament ==
Revelation 2:12 - 2:14 refers to Balak.

== Apocrypha ==
Balak is mentioned in chapter 10 of 2 Meqabyan, a book considered canonical in the Ethiopian Orthodox Tewahedo Church.

== Weekly Torah Portion ==
Balak is the name of the weekly parshah or portion in the annual Jewish cycle of Torah reading, constituting Numbers 22:2–25:9 which tells the story of Balak.

== Etymology ==
There are various proposed etymologies for the name Balak, all having to do with children or "waste" - The name Balak is in modern times claimed to come from the sparsely used Hebrew verb (balaq), waste or lay waste (Isaiah 24:1,3; Jeremiah 51:2). There are no derivations of this verb besides this name. Other proposals are: Devastator (BDB Theological Dictionary), Empty (NOBS Study Bible Name List), or Wasting (Jones' Dictionary of Old Testament Proper Names).
