= Ma Tovu =

Jewish prayer

Ma Tovu (Biblical Hebrew: מַה טֹּבוּ, lit. 'How lovely') is a prayer recited by religious Jews expressing reverence to entering synagogues and other places of worship in Judaism.

The prayer begins with Numbers 24:5, which records Balaam, sent to curse the Israelites, as instead being overcome with awe at God and the Israelites' worship. Its first line is a quote of Balaam's blessing and is thus the only prayer commonly used in Jewish prayer services that was written by a non-Jew. The remainder of the text is derived from passages in Psalms relating to entering the house of worship and preparation for further prayer. In this vein is the prayer recited by Jews at the beginning of the morning prayers when one would theoretically have just entered the synagogue.

== Text ==
Hebrew

מַה טֹּבוּ אֹהָלֶיךָ, יַעֲקֹב; מִשְׁכְּנֹתֶיךָ, יִשְׂרָאֵל
ואני ברב חסדך, אבוא ביתך
אשתחווה אל היכל קדשך, ביראתך
ה' אהבתי מעון ביתך ומקום משכן כבודך
ואני אשתחווה ואכרעה אברכה לפני ה' עשי
ואני תפילתי לך ה' עת רצון
אלוקים ברב חסדך ענני באמת ישעך

Romanization

Ma tovu ohalekha Ya'akov, mishk'notekha Yisra'el.
Va'ani b'rov hasd'kha, avo veytekha,
eshtahaveh el heikhal kodsh'kha b'yir'atekha.
Adonai, ahavti m'on beitekha um'kom mishkan k'vodekha.
Va'ani eshtakhaveh ve'ekhra'ah, avar'kha lifnei Adonai osi.
Va'ani t'filati l'kha Adonai et ratzon,
Elohim b'rov hasdekha aneini be'emet yish'ekha.

English translation

How lovely are your tents, O Jacob; your encampments, O Israel!
As for me, through Your abundant grace,
I enter your house to worship with awe in Your sacred place.
O Lord, I love the House where you dwell, and the place where your glory tabernacles.
I shall prostrate myself and bow; I shall kneel before the Lord my Maker.
To You, Eternal One, goes my prayer: may this be a time of your favor.
In Your abundant love, O God, answer me with the Truth of Your salvation.

== Musical settings ==
In modern times various composers have developed musical settings for Ma Tovu including:

- Samuel Adler
- Robert Strassburg (1993)
- Moshav Band
