= Balak (parashah) =

Jewish weekly Torah reading

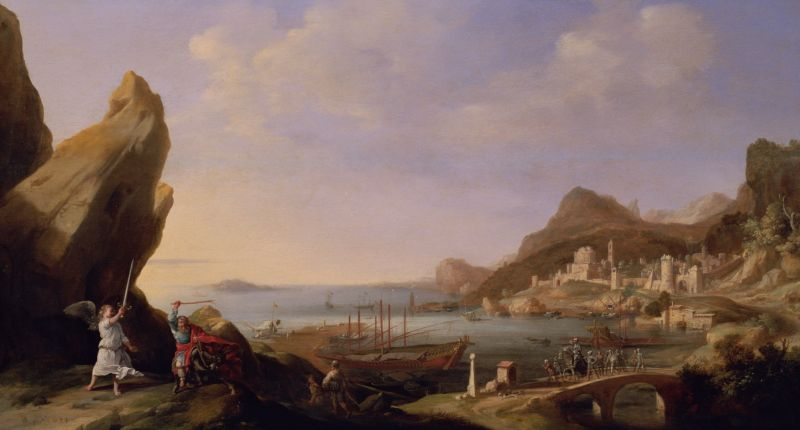
Coastal Landscape with Balaam and the Ass (1636 painting by Bartholomeus Breenbergh)

Balak (בָּלָק—Hebrew for "Balak," a name, the second word, and the first distinctive word, in the parashah) is the 40th weekly Torah portion (פָּרָשָׁה, parashah) in the annual Jewish cycle of Torah reading and the seventh in the Book of Numbers. In the parashah, Balak son of Zippor, king of Moab, tries to hire Balaam to curse Israel, Balaam's donkey speaks to Balaam, and Balaam blesses Israel instead. The parashah constitutes Numbers 22:2–25:9. The parashah is made up of 5,357 Hebrew letters, 1,455 Hebrew words, 104 verses, and 178 lines in a Torah Scroll (סֵפֶר תּוֹרָה, Sefer Torah).

Jews generally read it in late June or July. In most years (for example, 2024, 2025, and 2028), parashah Balak is read separately. In some years (for example, 2026 and 2027) when the second day of Shavuot falls on a Sabbath in the Diaspora (where observant Jews observe Shavuot for two days), parashah Balak is combined with the previous parashah, Chukat, in the Diaspora to synchronize readings thereafter with those in Israel (where Jews observe Shavuot for one day).

The name "Balak" means "devastator", "empty", or "wasting". The name apparently derives from the rarely used Hebrew verb (balak), "waste or lay waste."

== Readings ==
In traditional Sabbath Torah reading, the parashah is divided into seven readings, or עליות, aliyot.

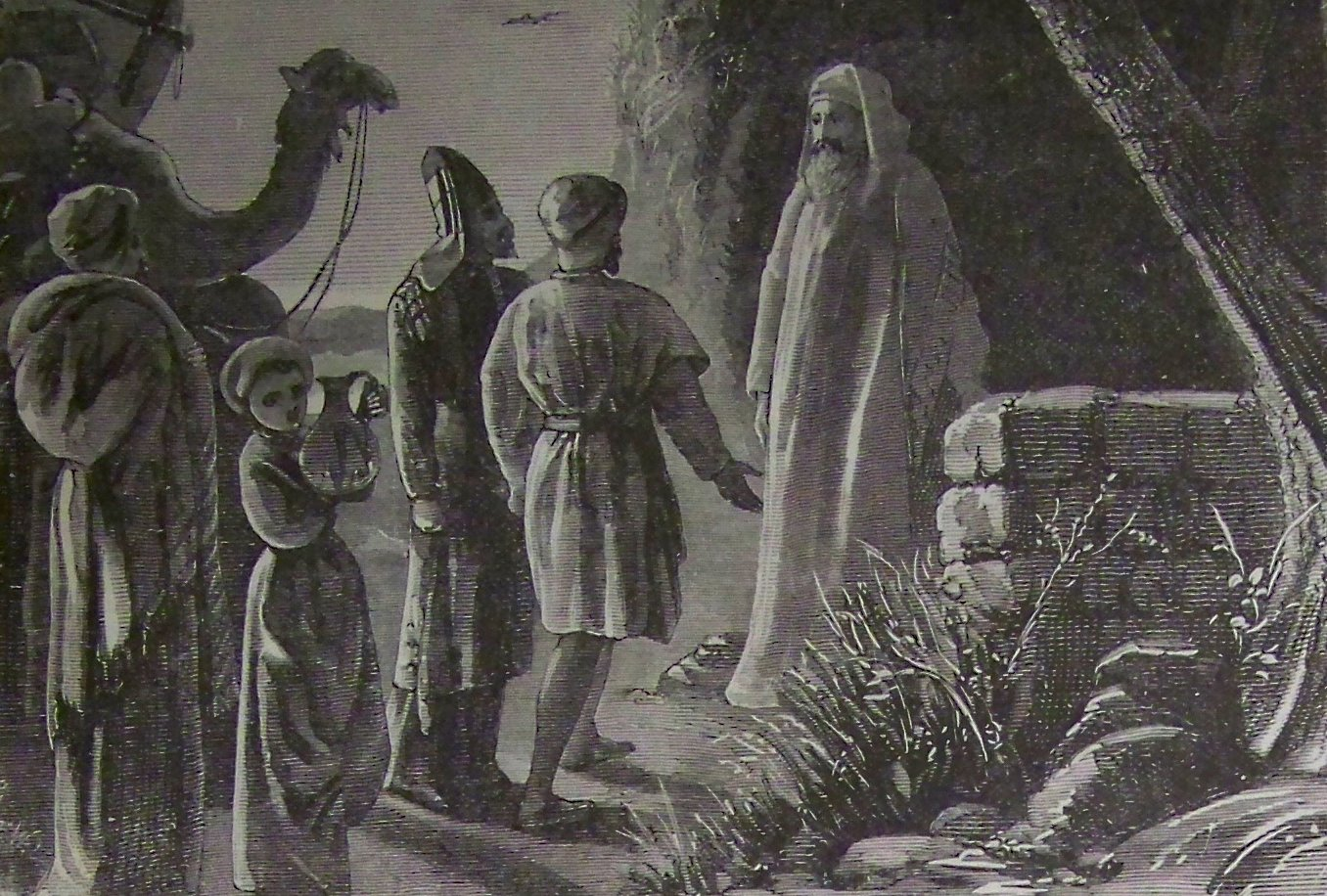
Balaam Receiving Balak's Messengers (illustration from the 1890 Holman Bible)

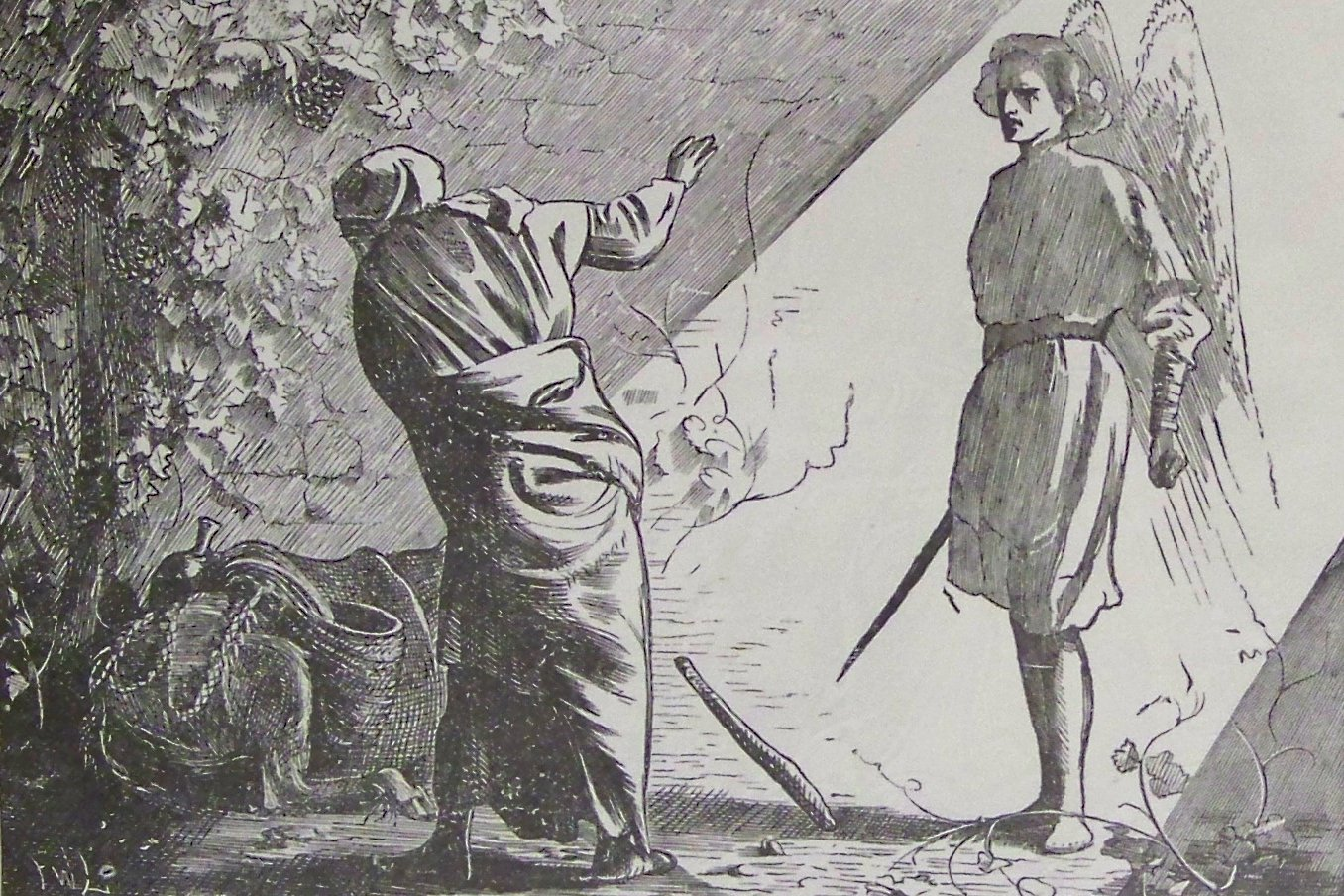
Balaam and the Angel (illustration from the 1890 Holman Bible)

=== First reading—Numbers 22:2–12 ===
In the first reading, Balak son of Zippor, king of Moab, grew alarmed at the Israelites’ military victories among the Amorites. He consulted with the elders of Midian and sent elders of Moab and Midian to the land by the Euphrates to invite the prophet Balaam to come and curse the Israelites for him. Balaam told them: "Spend the night here, and I shall reply to you as the Lord may instruct me." God came to Balaam and said: "You must not curse that people, for they are blessed."

=== Second reading—Numbers 22:13–20 ===
In the second reading, in the morning, Balaam asked Balak's dignitaries to leave, as God would not let him go with them, and they left and reported Balaam's answer to Balak. Then Balak sent more numerous and distinguished dignitaries, who offered Balaam rich rewards in return for damning the Israelites. But Balaam replied: "Though Balak were to give me his house full of silver and gold, I could not do anything, big or little, contrary to the command of the Lord my God." Nonetheless, Balaam invited the dignitaries to stay overnight to let Balaam find out what else God might say to him, and that night God told Balaam: "If these men have come to invite you, you may go with them."

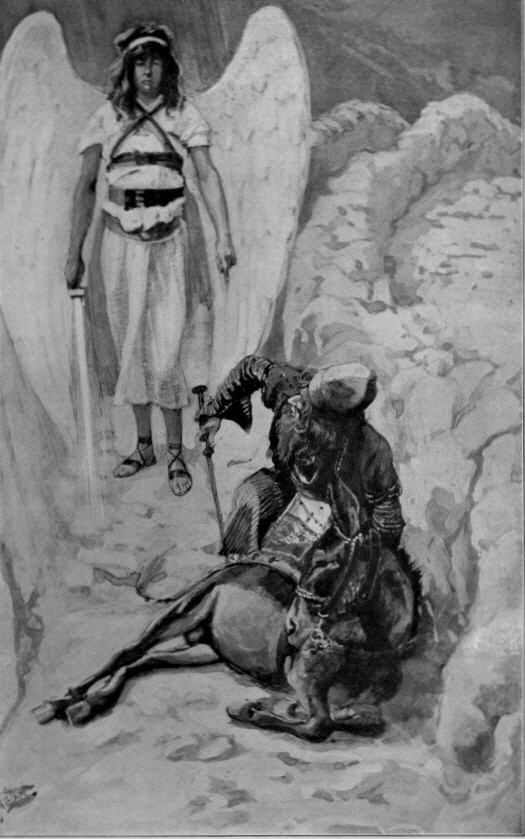
Balaam and the Ass (watercolor circa 1896–1902 by James Tissot)

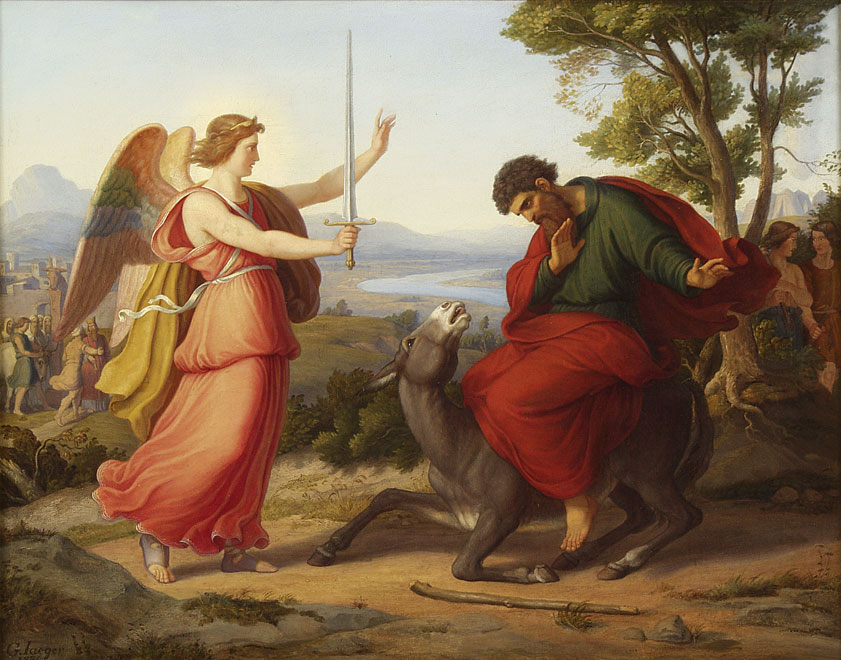
Balaam and the Angel (1836 painting by Gustav Jaeger)

=== Third reading—Numbers 22:21–38 ===
In the third reading, in the morning, Balaam saddled his donkey and departed with the dignitaries, but God was incensed at his going and placed an angel in Balaam's way. When the donkey saw the angel standing in the way holding his drawn sword, the donkey swerved from the road into the fields, and Balaam beat the ass to turn her back onto the road. The angel then stationed himself in a lane with a fence on either side. Seeing the angel, the donkey pressed herself and Balaam's foot against the wall, so he beat her again. The angel then stationed himself on a narrow spot that allowed no room to swerve right or left, and the donkey lay down under Balaam, and Balaam became furious and beat the ass with his stick. Then God allowed the donkey to speak, and she complained to Balaam. And then God allowed Balaam to see the angel, and Balaam bowed down to the ground. The angel questioned Balaam for beating his donkey, noting that she had saved Balaam's life. Balaam admitted his error and offered to turn back if the angel still disapproved. But the angel told Balaam: "Go with the men. But you must say nothing except what I tell you." So Balaam went on. Balak went out to meet Balaam on the Arnon border, and asked him why he didn't come earlier. But Balaam told Balak that he could utter only the words that God put into his mouth.

=== Fourth reading—Numbers 22:39–23:12 ===
In the fourth reading, Balaam and Balak went together to Kiriath-huzoth, where Balak sacrificed oxen and sheep, and they ate. In the morning, Balak took Balaam up to Bamoth-Baal, overlooking the Israelites. Balaam had Balak build seven altars, and they offered up a bull and a ram on each altar. Then Balaam asked Balak to wait while Balaam went off alone to see if God would grant him a manifestation. God appeared to Balaam and told him what to say. Balaam returned and said: "How can I damn whom God has not damned, how doom when the Lord has not doomed? . . . Who can count the dust of Jacob, number the dust-cloud of Israel? May I die the death of the upright, may my fate be like theirs!" Balak complained that he had brought Balaam to damn the Israelites, but instead Balaam blessed them. Balaam replied that he could only repeat what God put in his mouth.

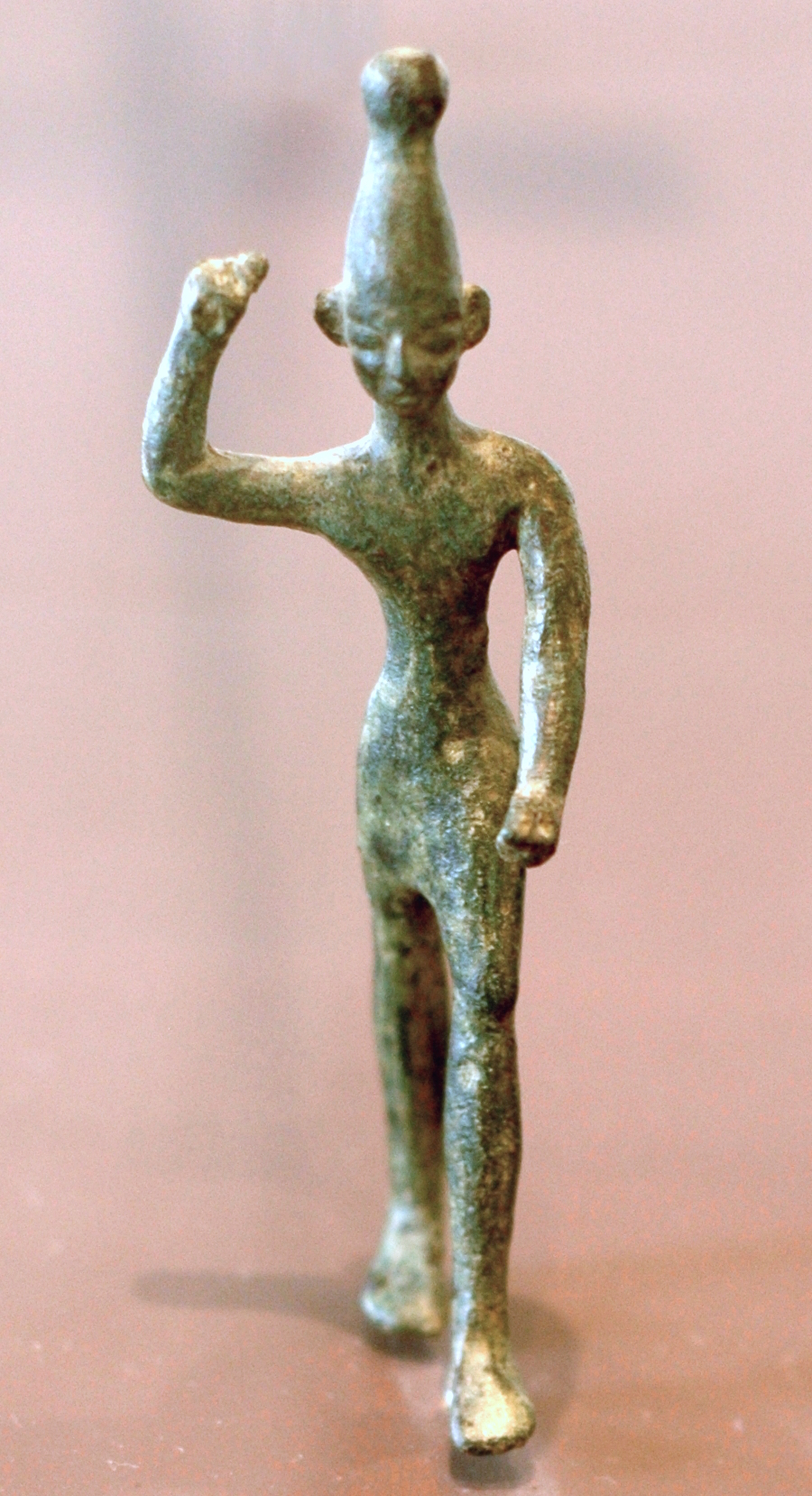
Baal (14th–12th century BCE bronze figurine from Ugarit)

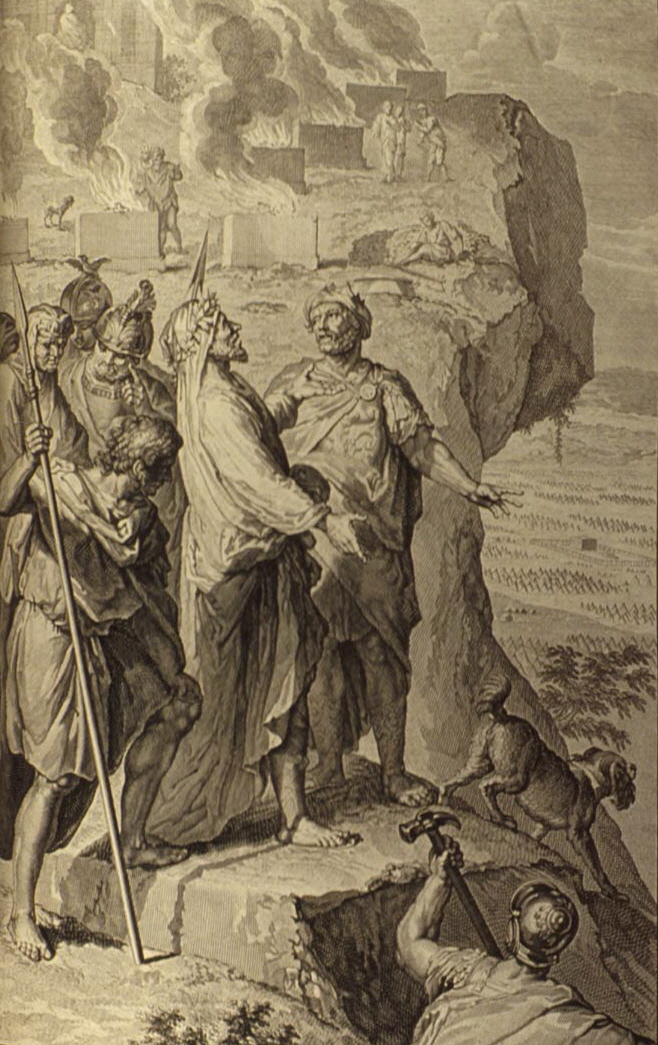
Balaam Blessing the Israelites (illustration from the 1728 Figures de la Bible)

=== Fifth reading—Numbers 23:13–26 ===
In the fifth reading, Balak took Balaam to the summit of Pisgah, once offered a bull and a ram on each of seven altars, and once again Balaam asked Balak to wait while Balaam went off alone to seek a manifestation, and once again God told him what to say. Balaam returned and told Balak: "My message was to bless: When He blesses, I cannot reverse it. No harm is in sight for Jacob, no woe in view for Israel. The Lord their God is with them." Then Balak told Balaam at least not to bless them, but Balaam replied that he had to do whatever God directed.

=== Sixth reading—Numbers 23:27–24:13 ===
In the sixth reading, Balak took Balaam to the peak of Peor, and once offered a bull and a ram on each of seven altars. Balaam, seeing that it pleased God to bless Israel, immediately turned to the Israelites and blessed them: "How fair are your tents, O Jacob, your dwellings, O Israel! . . . They shall devour enemy nations, crush their bones, and smash their arrows. . . . Blessed are they who bless you, accursed they who curse you!" Enraged, Balak complained and dismissed Balaam.

=== Seventh reading—Numbers 24:14–25:9 ===
In the seventh reading, Balaam replied once again that he could not do contrary to God's command, and blessed Israelites once again, saying: "A scepter comes forth from Israel; it smashes the brow of Moab." Then Balaam set out back home, and Balak went his way. While the Israelites stayed at Shittim, the people went whoring with the Moabite women and worshiped their god Baal-peor, enraging God. God told Moses to impale the ringleaders, and Moses directed Israel's officials to slay those who had attached themselves to Baal-peor. When one of the Israelites publicly brought a Midianite woman over to his companions, Phinehas son of Eleazar took a spear, followed the Israelite into the chamber, and stabbed the Israelite and the woman through the belly. Then the plague against the Israelites was checked, having killed 24,000.

=== Readings according to the triennial cycle ===
Jews who read the Torah according to the triennial cycle of Torah reading read the parashah according to a different schedule.

== In inner-Biblical interpretation ==
The parashah has parallels or is discussed in these Biblical sources:

=== Numbers chapter 22 ===
In Micah 6:5, the prophet asked Israel to recall that Balak consulted Balaam and Balaam had advised him.

The only time in the Bible that Balak is not mentioned in direct conjunction with Balaam is in Judges 11:25.

=== Numbers chapter 23 ===
Balaam's request in Numbers 23:10 to share Israel's fate fulfills God's blessing to Abraham in Genesis 12:3 that "all the families of the earth shall bless themselves by you," God's blessing to Abraham in Genesis 22:18 that "All the nations of the earth shall bless themselves by your descendants," and God's blessing to Jacob in Genesis 28:14 that "All the families of the earth shall bless themselves by you and your descendants."

=== Numbers chapter 24 ===
Balaam's observation that Israel was "encamped according to its tribes" (Numbers 24:2) shows that the leaders and people remained faithful to the tribe-based camp pattern which God had instructed Moses and Aaron to adopt in Numbers 2:1-14.

The Encampment of Israel "according to its tribes"
			North			
		Asher	DAN	Naphtali		
	Benjamin		Merari		Issachar	
West	EPHRAIM	Gershon	THE TABERNACLE	Priests	JUDAH	East
	Manasseh		Kohath		Zebulun	
		Gad	REUBEN	Simeon		
			South			

Psalm 1:3 interprets the words "cedars beside the waters" in Balaam's blessing in Numbers 24:6. According to Psalm 1:3, "a tree planted by streams of water" is one "that brings forth its fruit in its season, and whose leaf does not wither."

Numbers 24:17–18 prophesied, "A star rises from Jacob, a scepter comes forth from Israel . . . Edom becomes a possession, yea, Seir a possession of its enemies; but Israel is triumphant." Similarly, in Amos 9:11–12, the 8th century BCE prophet Amos announced a prophecy of God: "In that day, I will set up again the fallen booth of David: I will mend its breaches and set up its ruins anew. I will build it firm as in the days of old, so that they shall possess the rest of Edom."

=== Numbers chapter 25 ===
Tikva Frymer-Kensky called the Bible's six memories of the Baal-Peor incident in Numbers 25:1–13, Numbers 31:15–16, Deuteronomy 4:3–4, Joshua 22:16–18, Ezekiel 20:21–26, and Psalm 106:28–31 a testimony to its traumatic nature and to its prominence in Israel's memory.

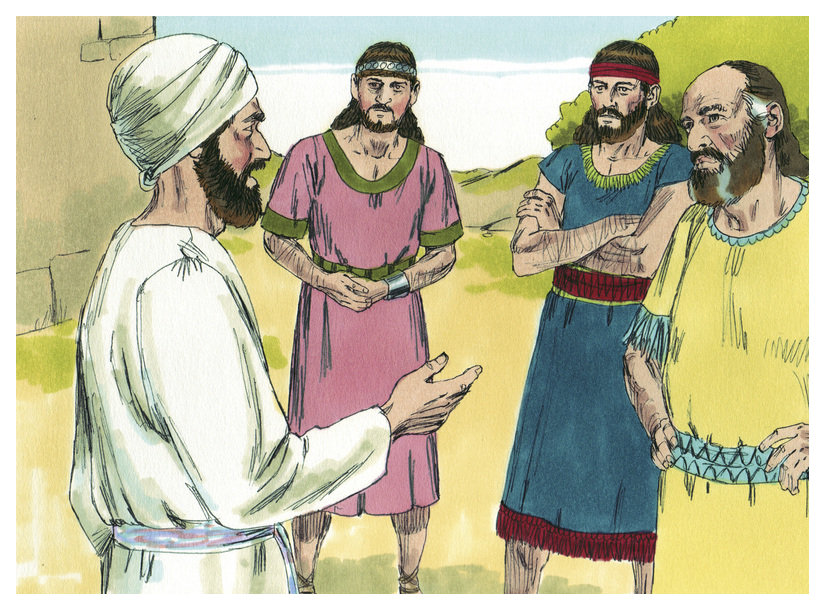
Phinehas confronted the Reubenites and Manassites (1984 illustration by Jim Padgett, courtesy of Distant Shores Media/Sweet Publishing)

In the retelling of Deuteronomy 4:3–4, God destroyed all the men who followed the Baal of Peor but kept alive to the day of Moses's address everyone who cleaved to God. Frymer-Kensky concluded that Deuteronomy stresses the moral lesson: Very simply, the guilty perished, and those who were alive to hear Moses were innocent survivors who could avoid destruction by staying fast to God.

In Joshua 22:16–18, Phinehas and ten princes of Israelite Tribes questioned the Reubenites’ and Manassites’ later building an altar across the Jordan, recalling that the Israelites had not cleansed themselves to that day of the iniquity of Peor, even though a plague had come upon the congregation at the time. Frymer-Kensky noted that the book of Joshua emphasizes the collective nature of sin and punishment, that the transgression of the Israelites at Peor still hung over them, and that any sin of the Reubenites and Manassites would bring down punishment on all Israel.

In Ezekiel 20:21–26, God recalled Israel's rebellion and God's resolve to pour out God's fury on them in the wilderness. God held back then for the sake of God's Name but swore that God would scatter them among the nations, because they looked with longing at idols. Frymer-Kensky called Ezekiel's memory the most catastrophic: Because the Israelites rebelled in the Baal-Peor incident, God vowed that they would ultimately lose the Land that they had not yet even entered. Even after the exile to Babylon, the incident loomed large in Israel's memory.

Psalm 106:28–31 reports that the Israelites attached themselves to Baal Peor and ate sacrifices offered to the dead, provoking God's anger and a plague. Psalm 106:30–31 reports that Phinehas stepped forward and intervened, the plague ceased, and it was reckoned to his merit forever. Frymer-Kensky noted that the Psalm 106:28–31, like Numbers 25:1–13, includes a savior, a salvation, and an explanation of the monopoly of the priesthood by the descendants of Phinehas. Michael Fishbane wrote that in retelling the story, the Psalmist notably omitted the explicit account of Phinehas's violent lancing of the offenders and substituted an account of the deed that could be read as nonviolent.

Numbers 31:16 reports that Balaam counseled the Israelites to break faith with God in the sin of Baal-Peor.

Joshua 13:22 states that the Israelites killed Balaam “the soothsayer” during war.

== In classical rabbinic interpretation ==
The parashah is discussed in these rabbinic sources from the era of the Mishnah and the Talmud:

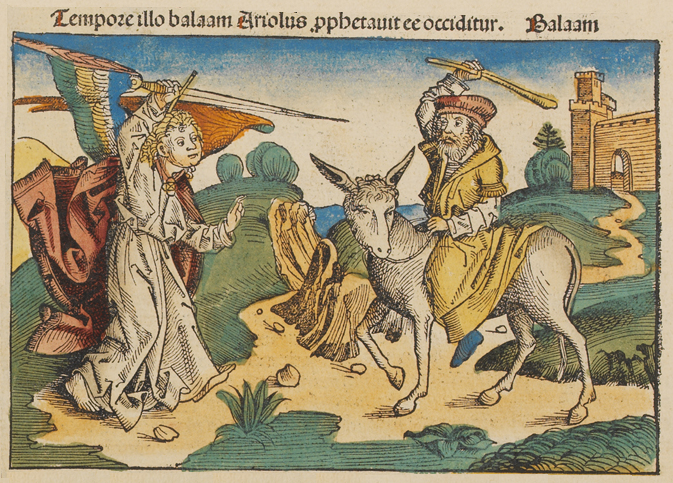
Balaam and the Angel (illustration from the 1493 Nuremberg Chronicle)

=== Numbers chapter 22 ===
A baraita taught that Moses wrote the Torah, the portion of Balaam, and the book of Job.

A midrash explained that the Torah records Balaam's story to make known that because the nonbeliever prophet Balaam did what he did, God removed prophecy and the Holy Spirit from nonbelievers. The midrash taught that God originally wished to deprive nonbelievers of the opportunity to argue that God had estranged them. So in an application of the principle of Deuteronomy 32:4, "The Rock, His work is perfect; for all His ways are Justice," God raised up kings, sages, and prophets for both Israel and nonbelievers alike. Just as God raised up Moses for Israel, God raised up Balaam for the nonbelievers. But whereas the prophets of Israel cautioned Israel against transgressions, as in Ezekiel 3:17, Balaam sought to breach the moral order by encouraging the sin of Baal-Peor in Numbers 25:1–13. And while the prophets of Israel retained compassion towards both Israel and nonbelievers alike, as reflected in Jeremiah 48:36 and Ezekiel 27:2, Balaam sought to uproot the whole nation of Israel for no crime. Thus God removed prophecy from nonbelievers.

Reading Deuteronomy 2:9, "And the Lord spoke to me, 'Distress not the Moabites, neither contend with them in battle,'" Ulla argued that it certainly could not have entered the mind of Moses to wage war without God's authorization. So we must deduce that Moses on his own reasoned that if in the case of the Midianites who came only to assist the Moabites (in Numbers 22:4), God commanded (in Numbers 25:17), "Vex the Midianites and smite them," in the case of the Moabites themselves, the same injunction should apply even more strongly. But God told Moses that his idea was incorrect. For God was to bring two doves forth from the Moabites and the Ammonites—Ruth the Moabitess and Naamah the Ammonitess.

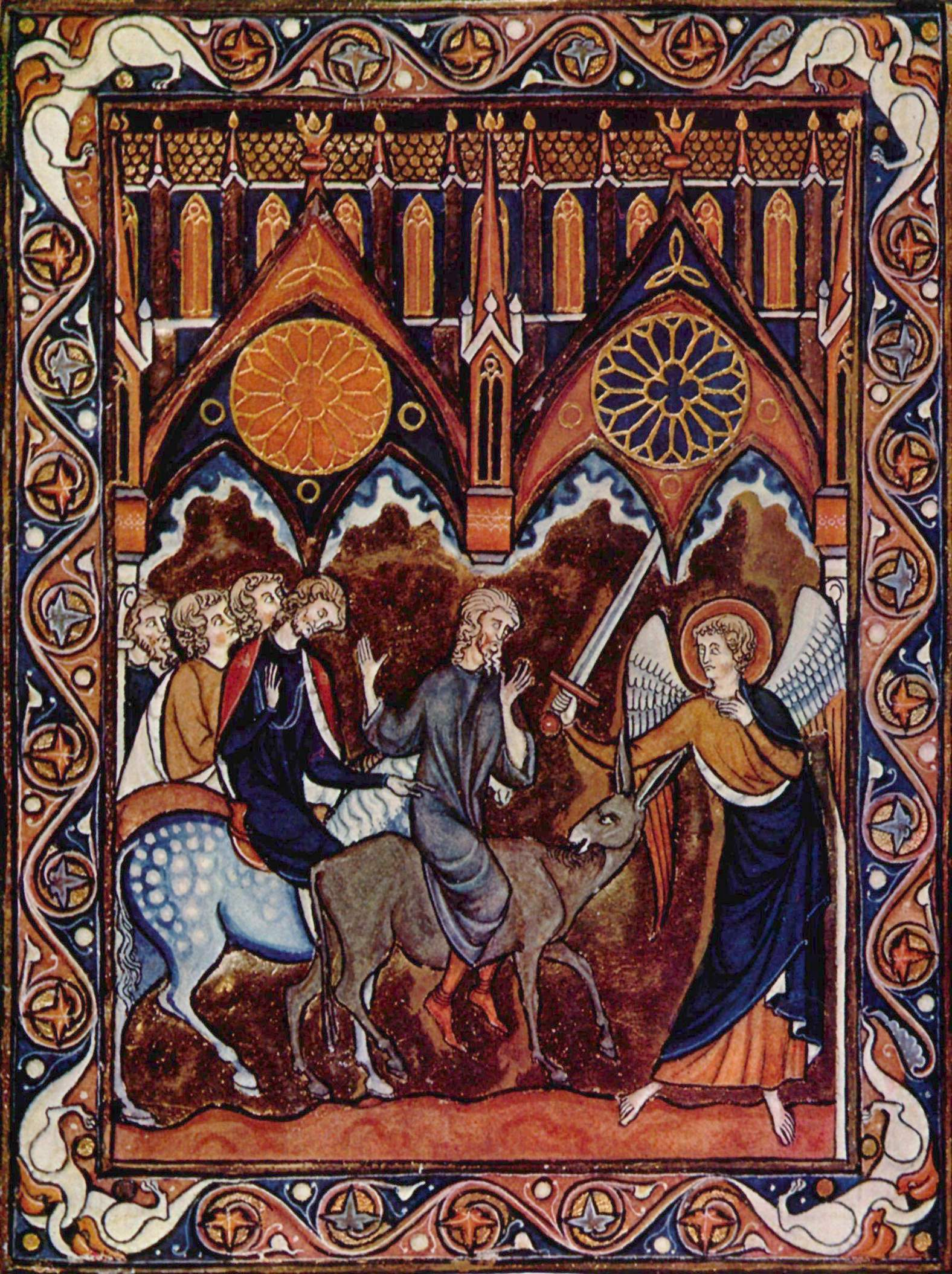
Balaam and the Angel (illustration from the 13th Century Psalter of Louis IX of France)

Classical Rabbinic interpretation viewed Balaam unfavorably. The Mishnah taught that Balaam was one of four commoners who have no portion in the World To Come, along with Doeg, Ahitophel, and Gehazi. Following the teaching of Rabbi Joshua, the Gemara deduced from the Mishnah's statement that the gentile Balaam would not enter the World To Come, while other gentiles would. The Gemara read Balaam's name to demonstrate that he was "without a people" (belo am). Alternatively, the Gemara read Balaam's name to demonstrate that he "confused a people" (bilah am), namely the Israelites. Noting the similarity of Balaam's father's name Beor to the Aramaic word for "beast" (be’ir), the Gemara read the allusion to Balaam's father in Numbers 22:5 to demonstrate that Balaam committed bestiality. A Tanna taught that Beor was the same person as Cushan-rishathaim and Laban. As rishathaim means "two evils," the Tanna deduced from the name Cushan-rishathaim that Beor perpetrated two evils on Israel—one in pursuing Jacob in Genesis 31:23-29 and the other by oppressing the Jews in Judges 3:8. Noting that Numbers 22:5 calls Balaam "the son of Beor" while Numbers 24:3 says of Balaam "his son [was] Beor," Rabbi Joḥanan deduced that Balaam's father Beor was like his son (less able) in matters of prophecy.

Similarly, the Mishnah taught that anyone who has an evil eye, a haughty spirit, and an over-ambitious soul is a disciple of Balaam the wicked and is destined for Gehinnom and descent into the pit of destruction. The Mishnah taught that Psalm 55:24 speaks of the disciples of Balaam when it says, "You, o God, will bring them down to the nethermost pit; men of blood and deceit shall not live out half their days.

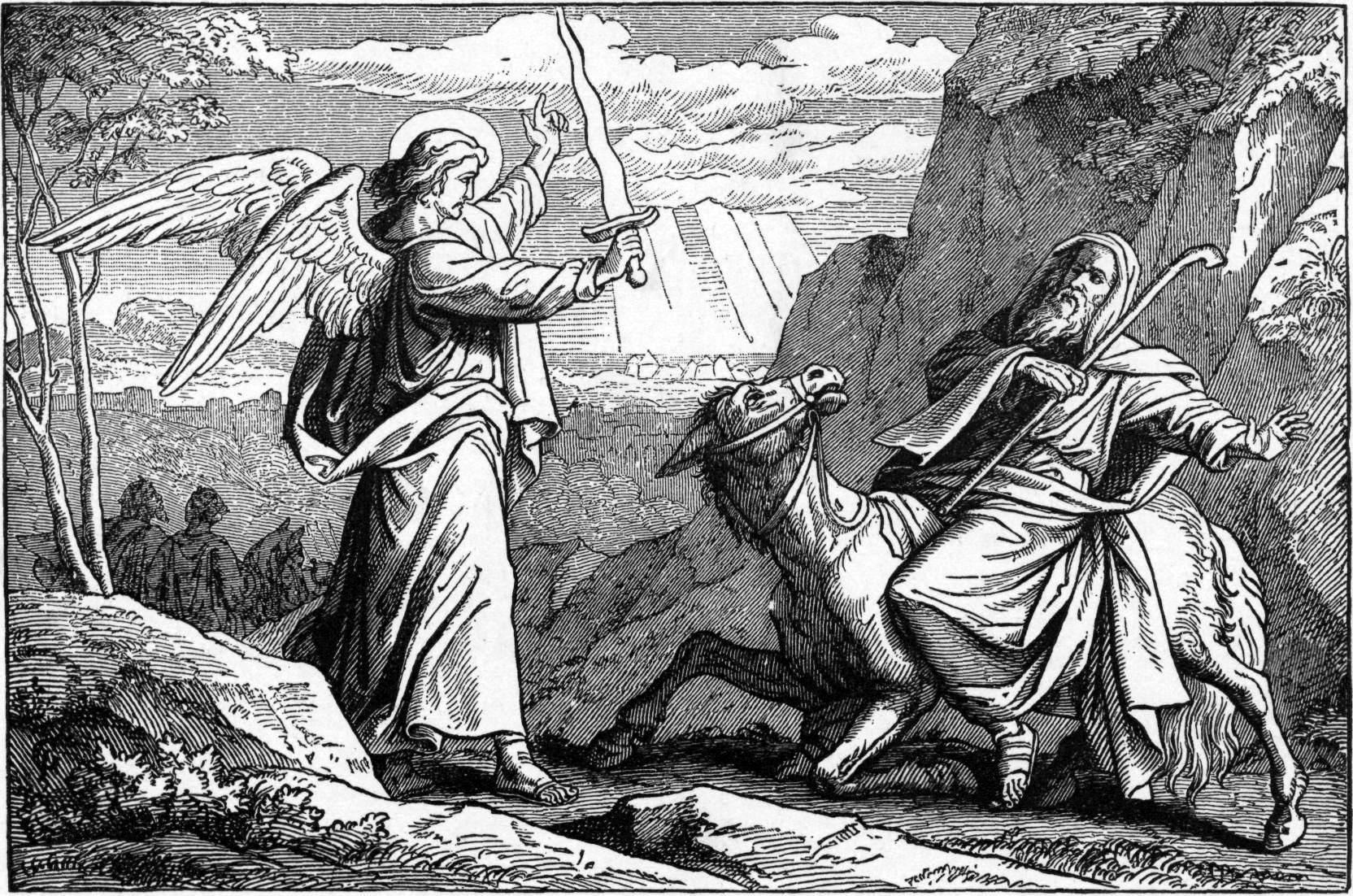
An Angel Met Balaam with a Sword (illustration from the 1897 Bible Pictures and What They Teach Us by Charles Foster)

Reading the description of Joshua 13:22, "Balaam also the son of Beor, the soothsayer," the Gemara asked why Joshua 13:22 describes Balaam merely as a soothsayer when he was also a prophet. Rabbi Joḥanan taught that at first, Balaam was a prophet, but at the end, he was merely a soothsayer. Rav Papa observed that this is an application of the popular saying that she who descended from princes and governors played the harlot with laborers (showing that she had no conception of the dignity of her beginnings).

Interpreting the words, "And the elders of Moab and the elders of Midian departed," in Numbers 22:7 a Tanna taught that there never was peace between Midian and Moab, comparing them to two dogs in a kernel that always fought each other. Then a wolf attacked one, and the other concluded that if he did not help the first, then the wolf would attack the second tomorrow. So they joined to fight the wolf. And Rav Papa likened the cooperation of Moab and Midian to the saying: "The weasel and cat had a feast on the fat of the luckless."

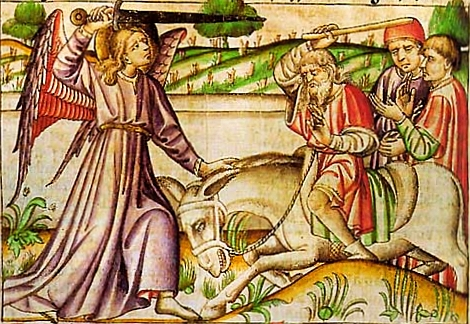
Balaam and the Angel (illustration from a 14th-century Spanish Bible (Biblia romanceada escurialense))

Noting that Numbers 22:8 makes no mention of the princes of Midian, the Gemara deduced that they despaired as soon as Balaam told them (in Numbers 22:8) that he would listen to God's instructions, for they reasoned that God would not curse Israel any more than a father would hate his son.

Noting that in Numbers 22:12 God told Balaam, "You shall not go with them," yet in Numbers 22:20, after Balaam impudently asked God a second time, God told Balaam, "Rise up and go with them," Rav Nachman concluded that impudence, even in the face of Heaven, sometimes brings results.

A midrash taught that the words of Numbers 22:20 "And God came to Balaam at night," indicated God's distance from Balaam. Rabbi Leazar taught that the words of Proverbs 15:29, "The Lord is far from the wicked," refer to the prophets of other nations. But the continuation of Proverbs 15:29, "He hears the prayer of the righteous," refers to the prophets of Israel. God appears to nations other that Israel only as one who comes from a distance, as Isaiah 39:3 says, "They came from a far country to me." But in connection with the prophets of Israel, Genesis 18:1 says, "And the Lord appeared," and Leviticus 1:1 says, "And the Lord called," implying from the immediate vicinity. Rabbi Haninah compared the difference between the prophets of Israel and the prophets of other nations to a king who was with his friend in a chamber (separated by a curtain). Whenever the king desired to speak to his friend, he folded up the curtain and spoke to him. (But God speaks to the prophets of other nations without folding back the curtain.) The Rabbis compared it to a king who has a wife and a concubine; to his wife he goes openly, but to his concubine he repairs with stealth. Similarly, God appears to non-Jews only at night, as Numbers 22:20 says, "And God came to Balaam at night," and Genesis 31:24 says, "And God came to Laban the Aramean in a dream of the night."

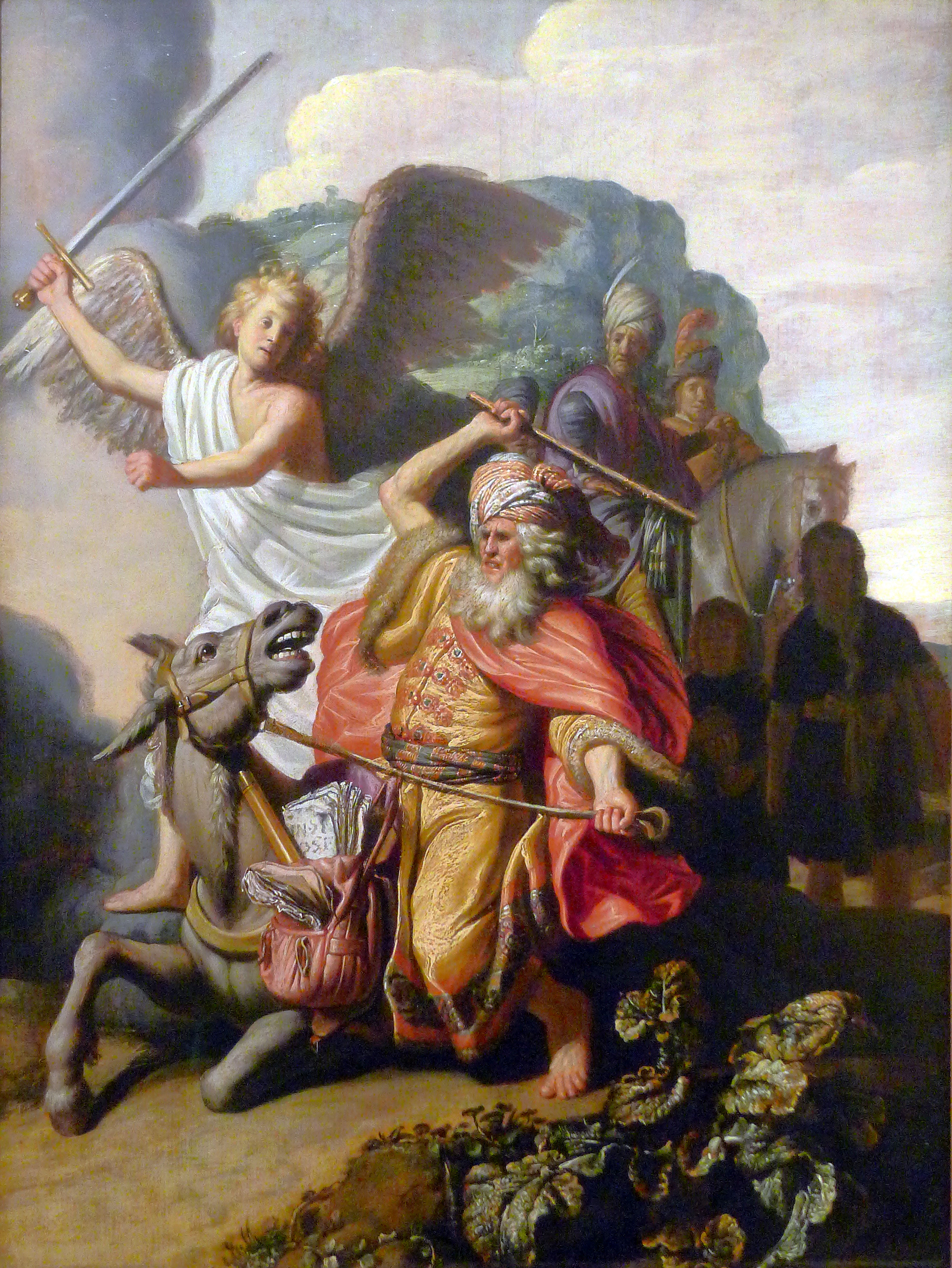
Balaam and the Ass (1626 painting by Rembrandt)

A Tanna taught in the name of Rabbi Simeon ben Eleazar that intense love and hate can cause one to disregard the perquisites of one's social position. The Tanna deduced that love may do so from Abraham, for Genesis 22:3 reports that "Abraham rose early in the morning, and saddled his donkey," rather than allow his servant to do so. Similarly, the Tanna deduced that hate may do so from Balaam, for Numbers 22:21 reports that "Balaam rose up in the morning, and saddled his donkey," rather than allow his servant to do so.

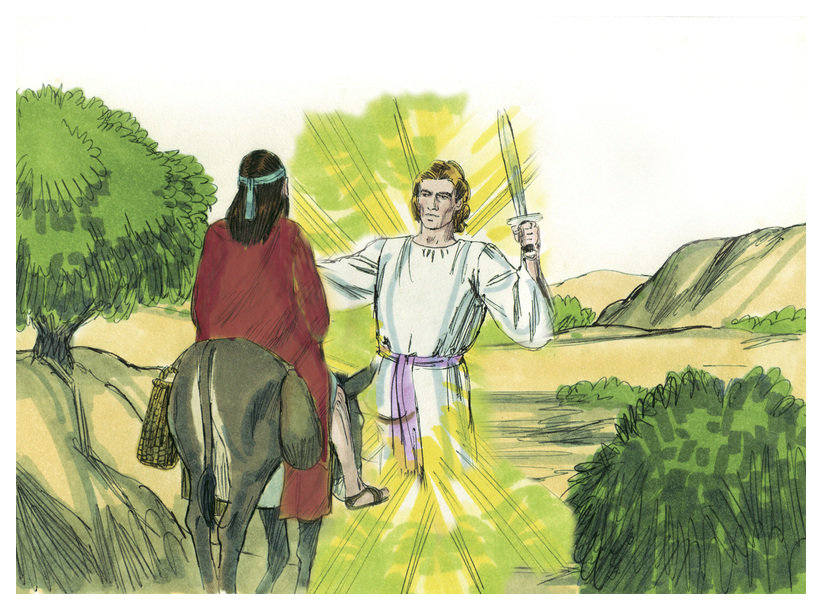
Balaam and the Angel (1984 illustration by Jim Padgett, courtesy of Sweet Publishing)

Reading Numbers 22:23, a midrash remarked on the irony that the villain Balaam was going to curse an entire nation that had not sinned against him, yet he had to smite his donkey to prevent it from going into a field.

The Mishnah taught that the mouth of the donkey that miraculously spoke to Balaam in Numbers 22:28–30 was one of ten things that God created on the eve of the first Sabbath at twilight.

Expanding on Numbers 22:30, the Gemara reported a conversation among Balak's emissaries, Balaam, and Balaam's donkey. Balak's emissaries asked Balaam, "Why didn’t you ride your horse?" Balaam replied, "I have put it out to pasture." But Balaam's donkey asked Balaam (in the words of Numbers 22:30), "Am I not your donkey?" Balaam replied, "Merely for carrying loads." Balaam's donkey said (in the words of Numbers 22:30), "Upon which you have ridden." Balaam replied, "That was only by chance." Balaam's donkey insisted (in the words of Numbers 22:30), "Ever since I was yours until this day."

The school of Rabbi Natan taught that the Torah contains an abbreviation in Numbers 22:32, “And the angel of the Lord said to him: Why did you hit your donkey these three times? Behold I have come out as an adversary because your way is contrary (יָרַט, yarat) against me.” The school of Rabbi Natan interpreted the word יָרַט, yarat, as an abbreviation for, “The donkey feared (יראה, yare’ah), it saw (ראתה, ra’atah), and it turned aside (נטתה, natetah).

=== Numbers chapter 23 ===
Rabbi Joḥanan deduced from the words "and he walked haltingly" in Numbers 23:3 that Balaam was disabled in one leg.

Rabbi Joḥanan interpreted the words "And the Lord put a word (or 'a thing') in Balaam's mouth" in Numbers 23:5 to indicate that God put a hook in Balaam's mouth, playing Balaam like a fish. Similarly, a midrash taught that God controlled Balaam's mouth as a person who puts a bit into the mouth of a beast and makes it go in the direction the person pleases.

Rabbi Samuel bar Nahmani interpreted the words "that the Lord your God shall keep for you" in Deuteronomy 7:12, teaching that all the good that Israel enjoys in this world results from the blessings with which Balaam blessed Israel, but the blessings with which the Patriarchs blessed Israel are reserved for the time to come, as signified by the words, "that the Lord your God shall keep for you."

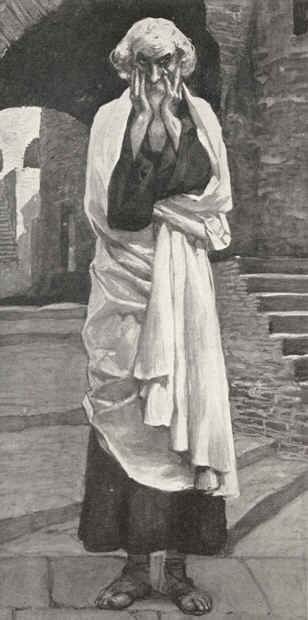
Micah (watercolor circa 1896–1902 by James Tissot)

The Gemara interpreted the words "knowing the mind of the most High" in Numbers 24:16 to mean that Balaam knew how to tell the exact moment when God was angry. The Gemara taught that this was related to what Micah meant (in Micah 6:5, in the haftarah for the parashah) when he told the Israelites (quoting God): "O My people, remember now what Balak king of Moab devised, and what Balaam the son of Beor answered him; . . . that you may know the righteous acts of the Lord." The Gemara taught that by the words "that you may know the righteous acts of the Lord," God meant to say to the Israelites, "You should know how many acts of charity I performed for you, in that I did not become angry all that time, in the days of wicked Balaam; for had I become angry at that time, no Israelite would have remained alive or been spared." And the Gemara indicated that this is why Balaam told Balak in Numbers 23:8, "How can I curse whom God has not cursed? or how shall I become angry, when the Lord has not become angry?" For Balaam knew that God was not angry at the Israelites. The Gemara thus concluded that for all of the time of the Balaam story, God had not been angry.

The Pirke De-Rabbi Eliezer taught that Balaam saw the wilderness filled with the Israelites' foreskins after they had circumcised themselves, and asked who would be able to arise by the merit of the blood of the covenant of this circumcision, which was covered by the dust, and thus in Numbers 23:10 Balaam said, "Who can count the dust of Jacob?"

The Gemara interpreted Balaam's words, "Let me die the death of the righteous," in Numbers 23:10 to foretell that he would not enter the World To Come. The Gemara interpreted those words to mean that if Balaam died a natural death like the righteous, then his end would be like that of the Jewish people, but if he died a violent death, then he would go to the same fate as the wicked.

Rabbi Hiyya bar Abba taught in the name of Rabbi Joḥanan that when in Numbers 23:10, Balaam said, "Let me die the death of the righteous," he sought the death of the Patriarchs Abraham, Isaac, and Jacob, who were called righteous.

A midrash taught that God concealed Balaam's fate from him until he had already sealed his fate. When he then saw his future, he began to pray for his soul in Numbers 23:10, "Let my soul die the death of the righteous."

A lion in a brick panel from the Procession Way of Babylon, now at the Pergamon Museum

Reading Numbers 23:24 and 24:9 (and other verses), Rabbi Joḥanan noted that the lion has six names—אֲרִי, ari in Numbers 23:24 and 24:9; כְּפִיר, kefir; לָבִיא, lavi in Numbers 23:24 and 24:9; לַיִשׁ, laish; שַׁחַל, shachal; and שָׁחַץ, shachatz.

The Tosefta read Numbers 23:24, "as a lion . . . he shall not lie down until he eats of the prey, and drinks the blood of the slain," to support the categorization of blood as a "drink" for the purpose of Sabbath limitations.

=== Numbers chapter 24 ===
Rabbi Joḥanan interpreted Numbers 24:2 to support the rule of Mishnah Bava Batra 3:7 that a person should not construct a house so that its doorway opens directly opposite another doorway across a courtyard. Rabbi Joḥanan taught that the words of Numbers 24:2, "And Balaam lifted up his eyes and he saw Israel dwelling according to their tribes," indicate that Balaam saw that the doors of their tents did not exactly face each other (and that the Israelites thus respected each other's privacy). So Balaam concluded that the Israelites were worthy to have the Divine Presence rest upon them (and he spoke his blessing in Numbers 24:5 of the tents of Jacob).

The Gemara deduced from the words "the man whose eye is open" in Numbers 24:3, which refer to only a single open eye, that Balaam was blind in one eye.

Rabbi Abbahu explained how Balaam became blind in one eye. Rabbi Abbahu interpreted the words of Balaam's blessing in Numbers 23:10, "Who has counted the dust of Jacob, or numbered the stock of Israel?" to teach that God counts the cohabitations of Israel, awaiting the appearance of the drop from which a righteous person might grow. Balaam questioned how God Who is pure and holy and Whose ministers are pure and holy could look upon such a thing. Immediately, Balaam's eye became blind, as attested in Numbers 24:3 (with its reference to a single open eye).

Rabbi Joḥanan taught that one may learn Balaam's intentions from the blessings of Numbers 24:5–6, for God reversed every intended curse into a blessing. Thus, Balaam wished to curse the Israelites to have no synagogues or school-houses, for Numbers 24:5, "How goodly are your tents, O Jacob," refers to synagogues and school-houses. Balaam wished that the Shechinah should not rest upon the Israelites, for in Numbers 24:5, "and your tabernacles, O Israel," the Tabernacle symbolizes the Divine Presence. Balaam wished that the Israelites' kingdom should not endure, for Numbers 24:6, "As the valleys are they spread forth," symbolizes the passing of time. Balaam wished that the Israelites might have no olive trees and vineyards, for in Numbers 24:6, he said, "as gardens by the river's side." Balaam wished that the Israelites' smell might not be fragrant, for in Numbers 24:6, he said, "as aloes planted of the Lord." Balaam wished that the Israelites' kings might not be tall, for in Numbers 24:6, he said, "and as cedar trees beside the waters." Balaam wished that the Israelites might not have a king who was the son of a king (and thus that they would have unrest and civil war), for in Numbers 24:6, he said, "He shall pour the water out of his buckets," signifying that one king would descend from another. Balaam wished that the Israelites' kingdom might not rule over other nations, for in Numbers 24:6, he said, "and his seed shall be in many waters." Balaam wished that the Israelites' kingdom might not be strong, for in Numbers 24:6, he said, "and his king shall be higher than Agag. Balaam wished that the Israelites’ kingdom might not be awe-inspiring, for in Numbers 24:6, he said, "and his kingdom shall be exalted. Rabbi Abba bar Kahana said that all of Balaam's curses, which God turned into blessings, reverted to curses (and Balaam's intention was eventually fulfilled), except the synagogues and schoolhouses, for Deuteronomy 23:6 says, "But the Lord your God turned the curse into a blessing for you, because the Lord your God loved you," using the singular "curse," and not the plural "curses" (so that God turned only the first intended curse permanently into a blessing, namely that concerning synagogues and school-houses, which are destined never to disappear from Israel).

A midrash told that when the Israelites asked Balaam when salvation would come, Balaam replied in the words of Numbers 24:17, "I see him (the Messiah), but not now; I behold him, but not near." God asked the Israelites whether they had lost their sense, for they should have known that Balaam would eventually descend to Gehinnom, and therefore did not wish God's salvation to come. God counseled the Israelites to be like Jacob, who said in Genesis 49:18, "I wait for Your salvation, O Lord." The midrash taught that God counseled the Israelites to wait for salvation, which is at hand, as Isaiah 54:1 says, "For My salvation is near to come."

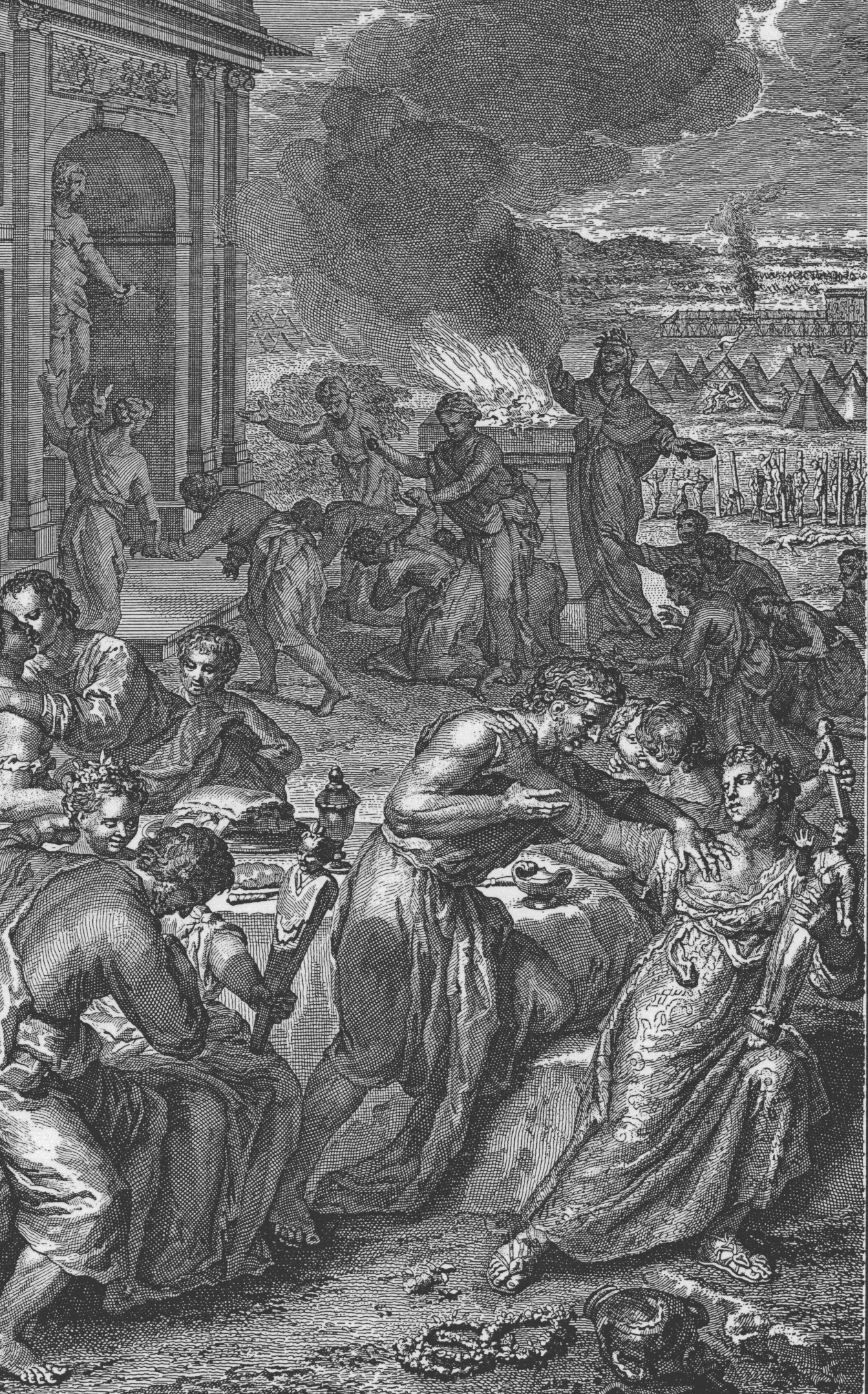
Moab Leads Israel into Sin (illustration from the 1728 Figures de la Bible)

=== Numbers chapter 25 ===
Rabbi Joḥanan taught that wherever Scripture uses the term "And he abode" (וַיֵּשֶׁב, vayeishev), as it does in Numbers 25:1, it presages trouble. Thus, in Numbers 25:1, "And Israel abode in Shittim" is followed by "and the people began to commit whoredom with the daughters of Moab." In Genesis 37:1, "And Jacob dwelt in the land where his father was a stranger, in the land of Canaan," is followed by Genesis 37:3, "and Joseph brought to his father their evil report." In Genesis 47:27, "And Israel dwelt in the land of Egypt, in the country of Goshen," is followed by Genesis 47:29, "And the time drew near that Israel must die." In 1 Kings 5:5, "And Judah and Israel dwelt safely, every man under his vine and under his fig tree," is followed by 1 Kings 11:14, "And the Lord stirred up an adversary unto Solomon, Hadad the Edomite; he was the king's seed in Edom."

A midrash taught that God heals with the very thing with which God wounds. Thus, Israel sinned in Shittim (so called because of its many acacia trees), as Numbers 25:1 says, "And Israel abode in Shittim, and the people began to commit harlotry with the daughters of Moab" (and also worshipped the Baal of Peor). But it was also through Shittim wood, or acacia-wood, that God healed the Israelites, for as Exodus 37:1 reports, "Bezalel made the Ark of acacia-wood."

Rabbi Judah taught that the words of Job 21:16, "The counsel of the wicked is far from me," refer to the counsel of Balaam, the wicked, who advised Midian, resulting in the death of 24,000 Israelite men. Rabbi Judah recounted that Balaam advised the Midianites that they would not be able to prevail over the Israelites unless the Israelites had sinned before God. So the Midianites made booths outside the Israelite camp and sold all kinds of merchandise. The young Israelite men went beyond the Israelite camp and saw the young Midianite women, who had painted their eyes like harlots, and they took wives from among them, and went astray after them, as Numbers 25:1 says, "And the people began to commit whoredom with the daughters of Moab."

Rabbi Hama son of Rabbi Hanina taught that Moses was buried near Beth-Peor to atone for the incident at Beth-Peor in Numbers 25.

The Rabbis taught that if a witness accused someone of worshipping an idol, the judges would ask, among other questions, whether the accused worshiped Peor (as Numbers 25:3 reports that the Israelites did).

Rabbah bar bar Hana said in Rabbi Joḥanan's name that had Zimri withdrawn from Cozbi and Phinehas still killed him, Phinehas would have been liable to execution for murder, and had Zimri killed Phinehas in self-defense, he would not have been liable to execution for murder, as Phinehas was a pursuer seeking to take Zimri's life.

The Gemara related what took place after, as Numbers 25:5 reports, "Moses said to the judges of Israel: ‘Slay everyone his men who have joined themselves to the Baal of Peor.’" The tribe of Simeon went to Zimri complaining that capital punishment was being meted out while he sat silently. So Zimri assembled 24,000 Israelites and went to Cozbi and demanded that she surrender herself to him. She replied that she was a king's daughter and her father had instructed her not to submit to any but to the greatest of men. Zimri replied that he was the prince of a tribe and that his tribe was greater than that of Moses, for Simeon was second in birth, while Levi was third. Zimri then seized Cozbi by her hair and brought her before Moses. Zimri demanded that Moses rule whether Cozbi was forbidden or permitted to Zimri. Zimri continued that if Moses were to say that Cozbi was forbidden to Zimri, then who permitted Moses to marry the Midianite woman Zipporah? At that moment, Moses forgot the law governing intimacy with an idolatrous woman, and all the people burst into tears, as Numbers 25:6 reports when it says, "they were weeping at the door of the tent of meeting."

Interpreting the words, "And Phinehas, the son of Eleazar, the son of Aaron the priest, saw it," in Numbers 25:7, the Gemara asked what Phinehas saw. Rav said that Phinehas saw what was happening and remembered the law governing intimacy with an idolatrous woman, and asked Moses whether he had not taught that zealots may punish one who cohabits with an idolatrous woman. Moses replied that he who reads the letter should be the agent to carry out its instructions. Alternatively, Samuel said that Phinehas saw that (in the words of Proverbs 21:30) "There is no wisdom nor understanding nor counsel against the Lord," which he interpreted to mean that whenever the Divine Name is being profaned, one may relax the general principle that one must defer to one's teacher—the giver of wisdom—and go ahead to make a legal decision in the presence of one's teacher. Rabbi Isaac said in Rabbi Eleazar's name that Phinehas saw the Angel of Death wreaking destruction among the people, and (in the words of Numbers 25:6) "he rose up out of the midst of the congregation and took a spear in his hand." Thus, Phinehas must not have had his spear when he sat among the congregation, and from this we learn that one may not enter a house of learning with weapons.

Reading the words of Numbers 25:7, "When Phinehas the son of Eleazar, son of Aaron the priest, saw," the Jerusalem Talmud asked what he saw. The Jerusalem Talmud answered that he saw the incident and remembered the law that zealots may beat up one who has sexual relations with an Aramean woman. But the Jerusalem Talmud reported that it was taught that this was not with the approval of sages. Rabbi Judah bar Pazzi taught that the sages wanted to excommunicate Phinehas, but the Holy Spirit rested upon him and stated the words of Numbers 25:13, "And it shall be to him, and to his descendants after him, the covenant of a perpetual priesthood, because he was jealous for his God, and made atonement for the people of Israel."

The Gemara taught that Phinehas then removed the point of the spear and hid it in his clothes and went along leaning upon the shaft of the spear as a walking stick. When he reached the tribe of Simeon, he asked why the tribe of Levi should not have the moral standards of the tribe of Simeon. Thereupon the Simeonites allowed him to pass through, saying that he had come to satisfy his lust. The Simeonites concluded that even the abstainers had then declared cohabiting wit Midianite women permissible.

Rabbi Joḥanan taught that Phinehas was able to accomplish his act of zealotry only because God performed six miracles: First, upon hearing Phinehas's warning, Zimri should have withdrawn from Cozbi and ended his transgression, but he did not. Second, Zimri should have cried out for help from his fellow Simeonites, but he did not. Third, Phinehas was able to drive his spear exactly through the sexual organs of Zimri and Cozbi as they were engaged in the act. Fourth, Zimri and Cozbi did not slip off the spear, but remained fixed so that others could witness their transgression. Fifth, an angel came and lifted the lintel so that Phinehas could exit holding the spear. And sixth, an angel came and sowed destruction among the people, distracting the Simeonites from killing Phinehas.

The interpreters of Scripture by symbol taught that the deeds of Phinehas explained why Deuteronomy 18:3 directed that the priests were to receive the foreleg, cheeks, and stomach of sacrifices. The foreleg represented the hand of Phinehas, as Numbers 25:7 reports that Phinehas "took a spear in his hand." The cheeks represent the prayer of Phinehas, as Psalm 106:30 reports, "Then Phinehas stood up and prayed, and so the plague was stayed." The stomach was to be taken in its literal sense, for Numbers 25:8 reports that Phinehas "thrust . . . the woman through her belly."

Based on Numbers 25:8 and 11, the Mishnah listed the case of a man who had sexual relations with an Aramaean woman as one of three cases for which it was permissible for zealots to punish the offender on the spot.

The Gemara asked whether the words in Exodus 6:25, "And Eleazar Aaron's son took him one of the daughters of Putiel to wife" did not convey that Eleazar's son Phinehas descended from Jethro, who fattened (piteim) calves for idol worship. The Gemara then provided an alternative explanation: Exodus 6:25 could mean that Phinehas descended from Joseph, who conquered (pitpeit) his passions (resisting Potiphar's wife, as reported in Genesis 39). But the Gemara asked, did not the tribes sneer at Phinehas and question how a youth (Phinehas) whose mother's father crammed calves for idol-worship could kill the head of a tribe in Israel—Zimri, Prince of Simeon—as reported in Numbers 25:14. The Gemara explained that the real explanation was that Phinehas descended from both Joseph and Jethro. If Phinehas's mother's father descended from Joseph, then Phinehas's mother's mother descended from Jethro. And if Phinehas's mother's father descended from Jethro, then Phinehas's mother's mother descended from Joseph. The Gemara explained that Exodus 6:25 implies this dual explanation of "Putiel" when it says, "of the daughters of Putiel," because the plural "daughters" implies two lines of ancestry (from both Joseph and Jethro).

The Gemara told that the Hasmonean King Alexander Jannaeus advised his wife not to fear the Pharisees or the Sadducees, but to beware of pretenders who sought to appear like Pharisees, as they acted like the wicked Zimri but sought a reward like that of the righteous Phinehas.

== In medieval Jewish interpretation ==
The parashah is discussed in these medieval Jewish sources:

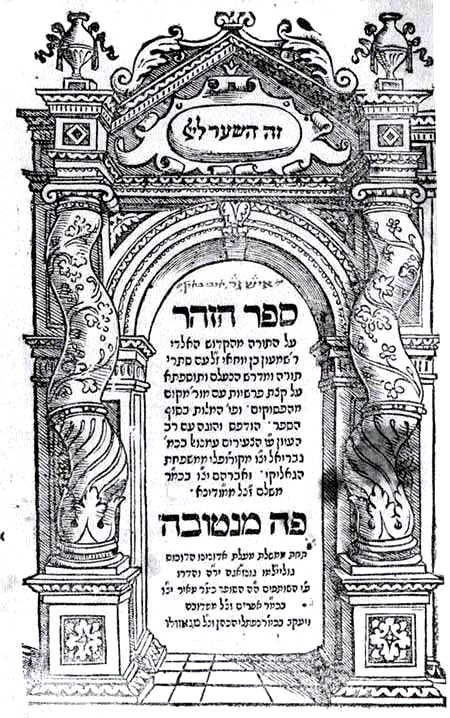
Zohar

=== Numbers chapter 22 ===
The Zohar reported that Rabbi Joḥanan asked Rabbi Isaac why Balak said (in Numbers 22:5), "Behold, there is a people come out from Egypt," instead of saying, "Behold, the children of Israel." Rabbi Isaac explained that Balak was a great sorcerer, and it was the way of sorcerers to speak precisely. Thus, in mentioning a person, sorcerers would never mention the name of the person's father, but use the name of the person's mother, because one's maternal descent is more certain. Rabbi Isaac said that sorcerers adopted this course because demons scrutinized every word uttered to them, and if it was false, they communicated false information to the speaker, but if it was true, they communicated truthful information, at least about things that were to happen soon. Even more was this the case when one invoked demons to perform some action. Rabbi Aha, however, said that Balak wished to show contempt for Israel by his expression, "Behold, a people went forth from Egypt," meaning to suggest that the Israelites were a people whose origin was unknown.

Noting that Numbers 22:23 reports that "the she-donkey saw" but Balaam did not see, Rashi explained that God permitted the animal to perceive more than the person, as a person possesses intelligence and would be driven insane by the sight of a harmful spirit.

In the word "even" (גַּם, gam) in Numbers 22:33 (implying that the angel would also have killed Balaam), Abraham ibn Ezra found evidence for the proposition that the donkey died after she spoke.

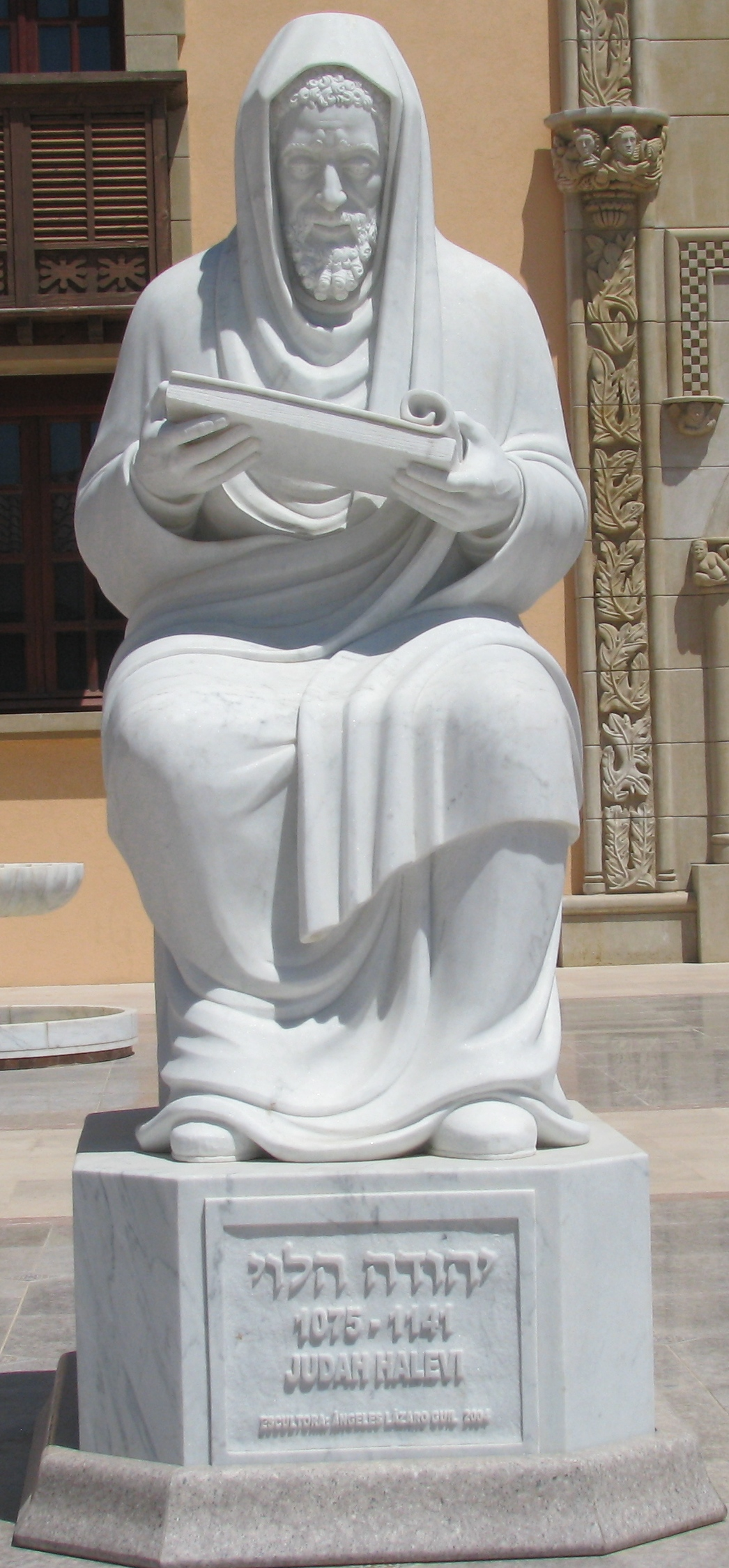
Judah Halevi

=== Numbers chapter 23 ===
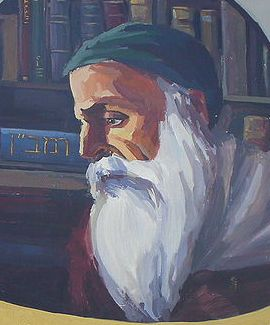
Nachmanides

Rashi read Balaam's request in Numbers 23:10 to "die the death of the upright" to mean that Balaam sought to die among the Israelites. Judah Halevi, however, saw in Balaam's prophetic prayer that his death might be made easy and his end be as the end of the Israelites an allusion to the immortality of the soul, the afterlife, and the resurrection of the dead. Similarly, Ibn Ezra stated his belief that Balaam wanted his end to be like the end of Israel, who are God's portion and granted a share in the World To Come. Ibn Ezra also noted that others said that "my end" repeats "let me die," for Balaam knew that he would die by the sword. Similarly, Nachmanides wrote that Balaam saw that the righteous would be inheritors of the Garden of Eden and life after death, and that Israel's "portion is in [eternal] life" (in the words of Psalm 17:14) and not in Gehenna and destruction. Thus Nachmanides read Balaam's prophecy to say that God does not want the Jews to be cursed and their end will be good, according to the way of the righteous. And Bachya ben Asher also read Balaam to wish for death, provided that his death would an eternal future like the Israelites, who Bachya saw as an integral part of God. Citing Ibn Ezra, Bachya noted that Balaam had foreseen a violent death by the sword for himself. Bachya read Balaam's prophecy to reveal that there is a world after death of the body consisting of disembodied souls, and that there is also a resurrection later when these disembodied souls will be reunited with their former bodies. In Bachya's view, Balaam expressed the hope that when he died, his soul would qualify for immediate transfer to that world (and not to the place where his soul would be being judged). Bachya concluded that Balaam's wish for this kind of death and afterlife for himself was proof that he paid the Jewish people the greatest possible compliment.

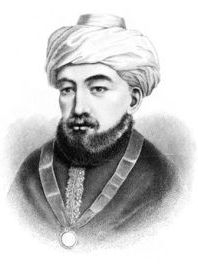
Moses Maimonides

=== Numbers chapter 25 ===
Following the Mishnah (see “In classical rabbinic interpretation” above), Maimonides acknowledged that based on Phinehas's slaying of Zimri, a zealot would be considered praiseworthy to strike a man who has sexual relations with a gentile woman in public, that is, in the presence of ten or more Jews. But Maimonides taught that the zealot could strike the fornicators only when they were actually engaged in the act, as was the case with Zimri, and if the transgressor ceased, he should not be slain, and if the zealot then killed the transgressor, the zealot could be executed as a murderer. Further, Maimonides taught that if the zealot came to ask permission from the court to kill the transgressor, the court should not instruct the zealot to do so, even if the zealot consulted the court during the act.

Baḥya ibn Paquda taught that those who trust that God will favor them without performing good deeds are like those of whom the Talmud says that they act like Zimri and expect the reward of Pinchas.

== In modern interpretation ==
The parashah is discussed in these modern sources:

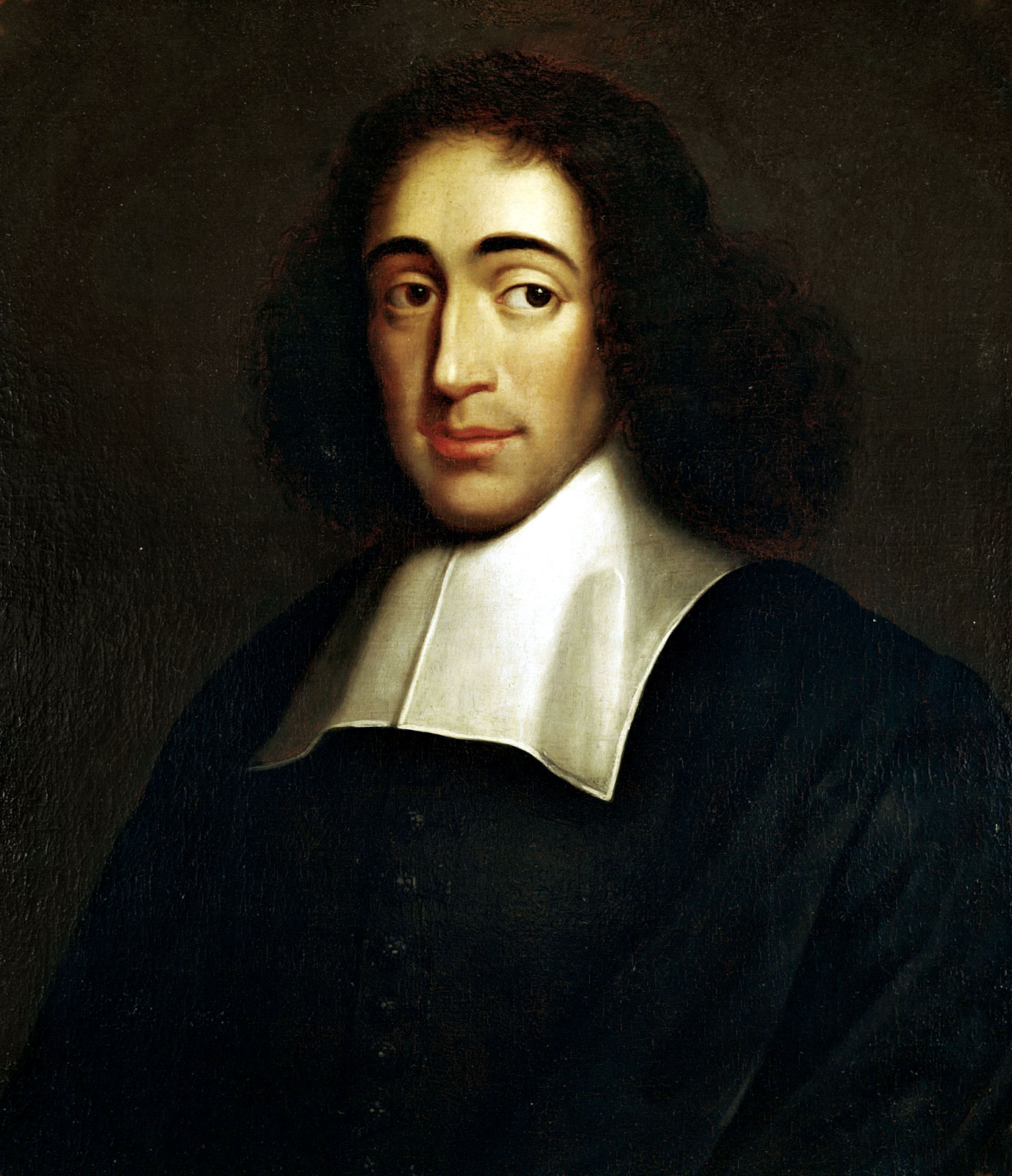
Spinoza

=== Numbers chapter 22 ===
Baruch Spinoza noted the similarity between Balak's description of Balaam in Numbers 22:6, "he whom you bless is blessed, and he whom you curse is cursed," and God's blessing of Abraham in Genesis 12:3 and deduced that Balaam also possessed the prophetic gift that God had given Abraham. Spinoza concluded that other nations, like the Jews, thus had their prophets who prophesied to them. And Spinoza concluded that Jews, apart from their social organization and government, possessed no gift of God above other peoples, and that there was no difference between Jews and non-Jews.

Robert Alter observed that the Balaam narrative builds on repeated key words and actions but repeats only certain phrases and dialogue verbatim. Alter pointed out that in Hebrew, the first word of the story in Numbers 22:2 is the verb "to see" (וַיַּרְא), which then becomes (with some synonyms) the main Leitwort in the tale about the nature of prophecy or vision. In Numbers 22:2, Balak saw what Israel did to the Amorites; in a vision in Numbers 23:9, Balaam saw Israel below him; in his last prophecy in Numbers 24:17, Balaam foresaw Israel's future. Balaam prefaced his last two prophecies with an affirmation in Numbers 24:3–4 of his powers as a seer: "utterance of the man open-eyed, . . . who the vision of Shaddai beholds, prostrate with eyes unveiled." Alter noted that all this "hullabaloo of visionary practice" stands in ironic contrast to Balaam's blindness to the angel his donkey could plainly see, until in Numbers 22:31, God chose to "unveil his eyes." Alter concluded that the story insists that God is the exclusive source of vision. Alter also noted reiterated phrase-motifs bearing on blessings and curses. In Numbers 22:6, Balak sent for Balaam to curse Israel believing that "Whom you bless is blessed and whom you curse is cursed." In Numbers 22:12, God set matters straight using the same two verb-stems: "You shall not curse the people, for it is blessed." In Numbers 23:7–8, Balaam concluded: "From Aram did Balak lead me . . . : ‘Go, curse me Jacob, and go, doom Israel.’ What can I curse that El has not cursed, and what can I doom that the Lord has not doomed?" Alter observed that Balaam was a poet as well as a seer, and taught that the story ultimately addresses whether language confers or confirms blessings and curses, and what the source of language's power is.

Nili Sacher Fox noted that Balaam’s talking donkey, whom Numbers 22:21–34 portrays as wiser than Balaam, is a jenny, a female donkey, perhaps reminiscent of the biblical personification of wisdom (חָכְמָה, chochmah) as female in, for example, Proverbs 1:20.

Diane Aronson Cohen wrote that the story of Balaam and his donkey in Numbers 22:21–34 provides an important model of an abuser venting misdirected anger in verbal abuse and physical violence. Cohen noted that the recipient of the abuse finally decided that she had had enough and stopped the abuse by speaking up. Cohen taught that we learn from the donkey that if we are on the receiving end of abuse, we have an obligation to speak out against our abuser.

=== Numbers chapter 23 ===
Neḥama Leibowitz contrasted God’s call of Israel's prophets in Jeremiah 1:4, Ezekiel 1:3, Hosea 1:1, and Joel 1:1 with Balaam's preliminaries to communion with God in Numbers 22:1–3 and 23:14–16. Leibowitz noted that Israel’s prophets did not run after prophecy, while Balaam hankered after prophecy, striving through magical means to force such power down from Heaven. Leibowitz marked a change in Balaam's third address, however, when Numbers 24:2 reports, "the spirit of God came upon him."

=== Numbers chapter 24 ===
Leibowitz contrasted how Israel's prophets continually emphasize the Divine authority for their messages, often using the phrase, "says the Lord," while Balaam prefaced his two later utterances in Numbers 24:3–16 with the introduction “The saying of Balaam the son of Beor, and the saying of the man whose eye is opened.”

=== Numbers chapter 25 ===
Dennis Olson noted parallels between the incident at Baal-Peor in Numbers 25:1–13 and the incident of the Golden Calf in Exodus 32, as each story contrasts God's working to ensure a relationship with Israel while Israel rebels. Olson noted these similarities: (1) In both stories, the people worship and make sacrifices to another god. (2) Both stories involve foreigners, in the Egyptians’ gold for the calf and the women of Moab and Midian. (3) In the aftermath of the Golden Calf story in Exodus 34:15–16, God commands the Israelites to avoid what happens in Numbers 25: making a covenant with the inhabitants, eating their sacrifices, and taking wives from among them who would make the Israelites’ sons bow to their gods. Numbers 25 displays this intermingling of sex and the worship of foreign gods, using the same Hebrew word, zanah, in Numbers 25:1. (4) The Levites kill 3,000 of those guilty of worshiping the Golden Calf, and the Israelite leaders are instructed to kill the people who had yoked themselves to the Baal of Peor. (5) Because of their obedience in carrying out God's punishment on the idolaters, the Levites are ordained for the service of God, and in Numbers 25, the priest Phinehas executes God's punishment on the sinners, and a special covenant of perpetual priesthood is established with him. (6) After the Golden Calf incident, Moses “makes atonement” for Israel, and in the Baal Peor episode, Phinehas “makes atonement” for Israel. (7) A plague is sent as punishment in both incidents.

George Buchanan Gray wrote that the Israelite men's participation in the sacrificial feasts followed their intimacy with the women, who then naturally invited their paramours to their feasts, which, according to custom, were sacrificial occasions. Gray considered that it would have been in accord with the sentiment of early Israelites to worship the Moabite god on his own territory. Similarly, Frymer-Kensky wrote that the cataclysm began with a dinner invitation from the Moabite women, who perhaps wanted to be friendly with the people whom Balaam had tried, but failed, to curse.

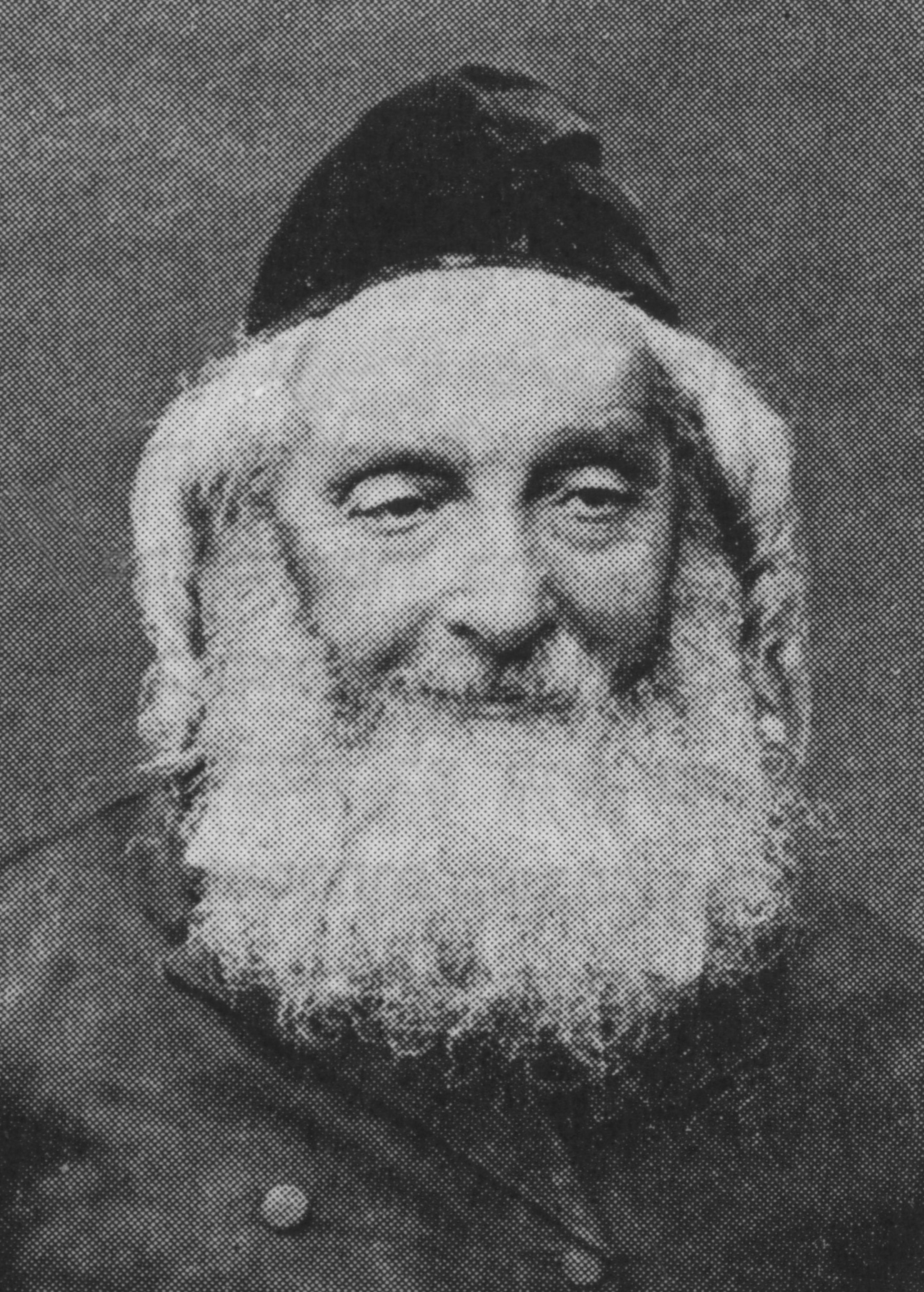
The Netziv

Noting that the story of Baal Peor in Numbers 25 shifts abruptly from Moabite women to the Midianite princess Cozbi, Frymer-Kensky suggested that the story may originally have been about Midianite women, whom Moses held responsible in Numbers 31:15–16. Frymer-Kensky suggested that "Moabite women" appear in Numbers 25 as an artistic device to create a symmetrical antithesis to the positive image of Ruth.

Naftali Zvi Yehuda Berlin (the Netziv) wrote that in Numbers 25:12, in reward for turning away God's wrath, God blessed Phinehas with the attribute of peace, so that he would not be quick-tempered or angry. Since the nature of Phinehas's act, killing with his own hands, left his heart filled with intense emotional unrest, God provided a means to soothe him so that he could cope with his situation and find peace and tranquility.

Tamara Cohn Eskenazi found the opening scene of Numbers 25 disturbing for a number of reasons: (1) because the new generation of Israelites fell prey to idolatry within view of the Promised Land; (2) because God rewarded Phinehas for acting violently and without recourse to due process; and (3) because women receive disproportionate blame for the people's downfall. Eskenazi taught that God rewarded Phinehas, elevating him above other descendants of Aaron, because of Phinehas's swift and ruthless response to idolatry, unlike his grandfather Aaron, who collaborated with idolaters in the case of the Golden Calf. By demonstrating unflinching loyalty to God, Phinehas restored the stature of the priests as deserving mediators between Israel and God. Eskenazi noted that although God ordered death for all the ringleaders in Numbers 25:4, Phinehas satisfied God's demand for punishment by killing only two leaders, thereby causing less rather than more bloodshed.

== Commandments ==
According to Maimonides and the Sefer ha-Chinuch, there are no commandments in the parashah.

== Haftarah ==
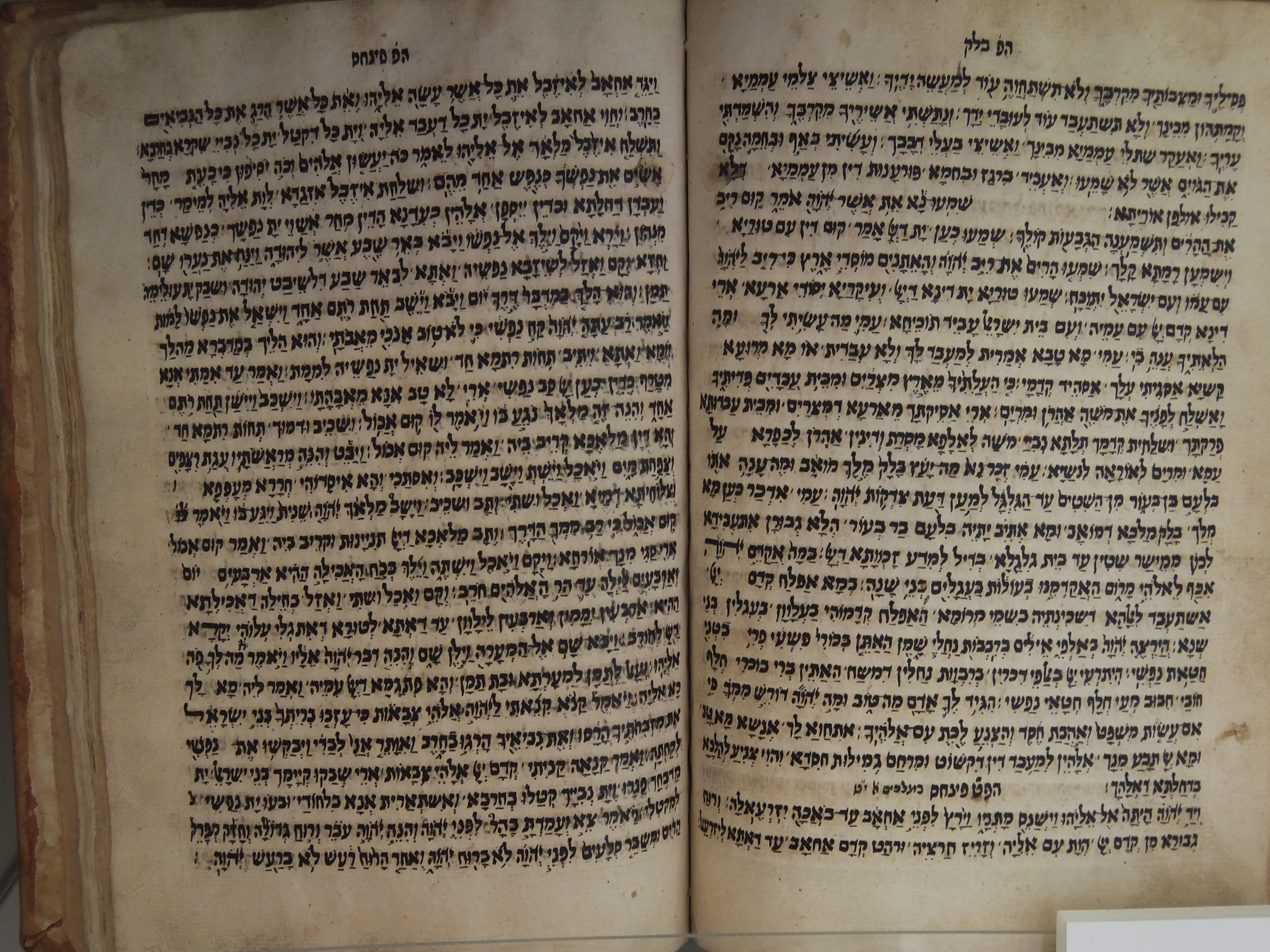
Handwritten manuscript opened to the haftarah of Balak (Yemen, 19th century)

The haftarah for the parashah is Micah 5:6–6:8. When parashah Balak is combined with parashah Chukat (as it is in 2026 and 2027), the haftarah remains the haftarah for Balak.

=== Connection between the haftarah and the parashah ===
In the haftarah in Micah 6:5, Micah quotes God's admonition to the Israelites to recall the events of the parashah, to "remember now what Balak king of Moab devised, and what Balaam the son of Beor answered him." The verb that the haftarah uses for "answer" (עָנָה, ‘anah) in Micah 6:5 is a variation of the same verb that the parashah uses to describe Balaam's "answer" (וַיַּעַן, vaya‘an) to Balaak in the parashah in Numbers 22:18 and 23:12. And the first words of Balaam's blessing of Israel in Numbers 24:5, "how goodly" (מַה-טֹּבוּ, ma tovu), are echoed in the haftarah's admonition in Micah 6:8 of "what is good" (מַה-טּוֹב, ma tov) in God's sight, namely "to do justly, and to love mercy, and to walk humbly with your God."

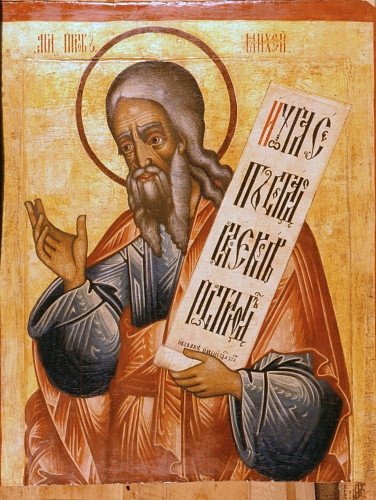
Micah (18th century Russian Orthodox icon in the Kizhi monastery, in Karelia, Russia)

=== The haftarah in classical rabbinic interpretation ===
The Gemara read the closing admonition of the haftarah, ""to do justly, and to love mercy, and to walk humbly with your God," as one of several distillations of the principles underlying the Torah. Rabbi Simlai taught that God communicated 613 precepts to Moses. David reduced them to eleven principles, as Psalm 15 says, "Lord, who shall sojourn in Your Tabernacle? Who shall dwell in Your holy mountain?—He who [1] walks uprightly, and [2] works righteousness, and [3] speaks truth in his heart; who [4] has no slander upon his tongue, [5] nor does evil to his fellow, [6] nor takes up a reproach against his neighbor, [7] in whose eyes a vile person is despised, but [8] he honors them who fear the Lord, [9] he swears to his own hurt and changes not, [10] he puts not out his money on interest, [11] nor takes a bribe against the innocent." Isaiah reduced them to six principles, as Isaiah 33:15–16 says, "He who [1] walks righteously, and [2] speaks uprightly, [3] he who despises the gain of oppressions, [4] who shakes his hand from holding of bribes, [5] who stops his ear from hearing of blood, [6] and shuts his eyes from looking upon evil; he shall dwell on high." Micah reduced them to three principles, as Micah 6:8 says, "It has been told you, o man, what is good, and what the Lord requires of you: only [1] to do justly, and [2] to love mercy, and [3] to walk humbly before your God." The Gemara interpreted "to do justly" to mean maintaining justice; "to love mercy" to mean rendering every kind office, and "walking humbly before your God" to mean walking in funeral and bridal processions. And the Gemara concluded that if the Torah enjoins "walking humbly" in public matters, it is ever so much more requisite in matters that usually call for modesty. Returning to the commandments of the Torah, Isaiah reduced them to two principles, as Isaiah 56:1 says, "Thus says the Lord, [1] Keep justice and [2] do righteousness." Amos reduced them to one principle, as Amos 5:4 says, "For thus says the Lord to the house of Israel, ‘Seek Me and live.’" To this Rav Nahman bar Isaac demurred, saying that this might be taken as: Seek Me by observing the whole Torah and live. The Gemara concluded that Habakkuk based all the Torah's commandments on one principle, as Habakkuk 2:4 says, "But the righteous shall live by his faith."

== In the liturgy ==
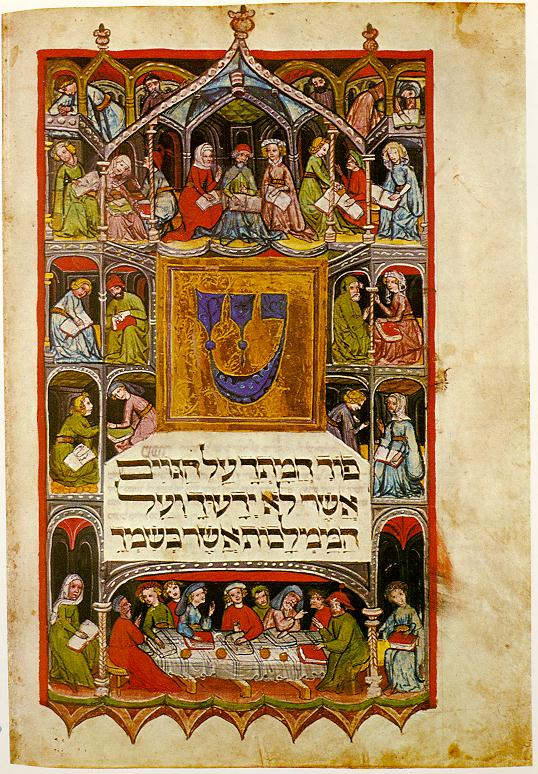
A page from a 14th-century German Haggadah

Some Jews read about how the donkey opened its mouth to speak to Balaam in Numbers 22:28 and Balaam's three traits as they study Pirkei Avot chapter 5 on a Sabbath between Passover and Rosh Hashanah.

The Passover Haggadah, in the concluding nirtzah section of the Seder, quotes the words "who can count them" from Numbers 23:10 to invoke blessing on the Jewish people.

Balaam's blessing of Israel in Numbers 24:5 constitutes the first line of the Ma Tovu prayer often said upon entering a synagogue or at the beginning of morning services. These words are the only prayer in the siddur attributed to a non-Jew.

== The Weekly Maqam ==
In the Weekly Maqam, Sephardi Jews each week base the songs of the services on the content of that week's parashah. For parashah Balak, Sephardi Jews apply Maqam Mahour, the maqam that portrays emotional instability and anger. This maqam is similar to Maqam Rast in tune, except that it is higher in key. It is appropriate, because in this parashah, Balak became angered as the curses of Balaam turned into blessings.

== See also ==
- Islamic view of Balaam
